= Frederick III of Austria =

Austrian duke (1347–1362)

Frederick III
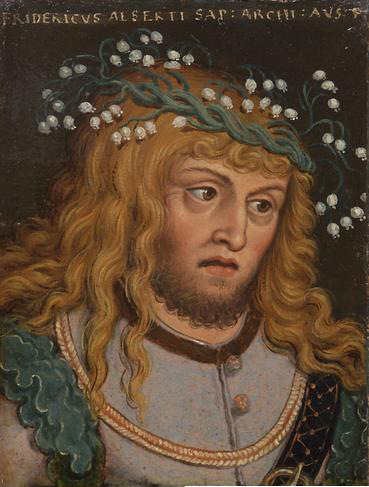
- Frederick III by Anton Boys
- Born: 31 March 1347; Vienna, Duchy of Austria
- Died: 10 December 1362 (aged 15); Vienna, Duchy of Austria
- Burial: Ducal Crypt, Vienna
- House: Habsburg
- Father: Albert II of Austria
- Mother: Joanna of Pfirt

Frederick III of Austria (31 March 1347 – 10 December 1362) was the second son of Duke Albert II of Austria and a younger brother of Duke Rudolf IV. He was born and died in Vienna, where he is buried in the Ducal Crypt.

== Ancestry ==
Ancestors of Frederick III of Austria

8. Rudolf I, King of the Romans
4. Albert I, King of the Romans
9. Gertrude of Hohenberg
2. Albert II, Duke of Austria
10. Meinhard, Duke of Carinthia
5. Elisabeth of Carinthia
11. Elisabeth of Bavaria
1. Frederick III of Austria
12. Theobald, Count of Pfirt
6. Ulrich III, Count of Pfirt
13. Catherine of Klingen
3. Joanna of Pfirt
14. Reginald of Burgundy
7. Joanna of Burgundy
15. Guillemette of Neufchâtel

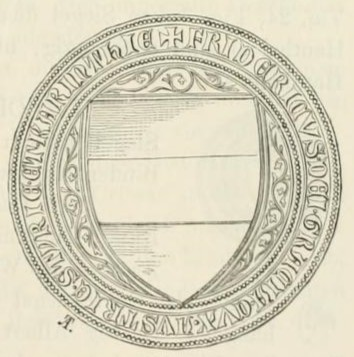

== Male-line family tree ==
House of Habsburg

Original line
Albert; Count of Habsburg c. 1188–1239
Rudolf I of Germany c. 1218–1291
Albert I of Germany; 1255–1308 | Hartmann; 1263–1281 | Rudolf II; Duke of Austria; 1270–1290
Rudolf I of Bohemia; 1281–1307 | Frederick the Fair c. 1289–1330 | Leopold I Duke of Austria; 1290–1326 | Albert II; Duke of Austria; 1298–1358 | Henry the Friendly; 1299–1327 | Otto; Duke of Austria; 1301–1339 | John; Parricida c. 1290–1312/1313
Albertinian line | Leopoldian line
Rudolf IV; Duke of Austria; 1339–1365 | Frederick III; 1347–1362 | Albert III; Duke of Austria; 1349–1395 | Leopold III; Duke of Austria; 1351–1386 | Frederick II; Duke of Austria; 1327–1344 | Leopold II; Duke of Austria; 1328–1344
Albert IV; Duke of Austria; 1377–1404 | William; Duke of Austria c. 1370–1406 | Leopold IV; Duke of Austria; 1371–1411 | Ernest; Duke of Austria; 1377–1424 | Frederick IV; Duke of Austria; 1382–1439
Albert II of Germany; 1397–1439 | Frederick III; HRE; 1415–1493 | Albert VI; Archduke of Austria; 1418–1463 | Sigismund; Archduke of Austria; 1427–1496
Ladislaus the Posthumous; 1440–1457 | Maximilian I HRE; 1459–1519
Philip I of Castile; 1478–1506
Spanish / Iberian line | Austrian / HRE line
Charles V HRE; 1500–1558 | Ferdinand I HRE; 1503–1564
Philip II of Spain; 1527–1598 | Maximilian II; HRE; 1527–1576 | Ferdinand II; Archduke of Austria; 1529–1595 | Charles II; Archduke of Austria; 1540–1590
Carlos; Prince of Asturias; 1545–1568 | Philip III of Spain; 1578–1621 | Rudolf II; HRE; 1552–1612 | Ernest of Austria; 1553–1595 | Matthias; HRE; 1557–1619 | Maximilian III; Archduke of Austria; 1558–1618 | Albert VII; Archduke of Austria; 1559–1621 | Wenceslaus; Archduke of Austria; 1561–1578 | Andrew; Margrave of Burgau; 1558–1600 | Charles; Margrave of Burgau; 1560–1618 | Ferdinand II; HRE; 1578–1637 | Maximilian Ernest of Austria; 1583–1616 | Leopold V Archduke of Austria; 1586–1632 | Charles of Austria; 1590–1624
Philip IV of Spain; 1605–1665 | Charles of Austria; 1607–1632 | Ferdinand of Austria; 1609–1641 | John-Charles of Austria; 1605–1619 | Ferdinand III; HRE; 1608–1657 | Leopold Wilhelm of Austria; 1614–1662 | Ferdinand Charles; Archduke of Austria; 1628–1662 | Sigismund Francis; Archduke of Austria; 1630–1665
Balthasar Charles; Prince of Asturias; 1629–1646 | Charles II of Spain; 1661–1700 | Ferdinand IV; King of the Romans; 1633–1654 | Leopold I HRE; 1640–1705 | Charles Joseph of Austria; 1649–1664
Joseph I HRE; 1678–1711 | Charles VI; HRE; 1685–1740
Lorraine
Maria Theresa; HRE; 1740–1780 | Francis I HRE; 1745–1765
Habsburg-Lorraine
Joseph II; HRE; 1765–1790 | Leopold II; HRE; 1790–1792
Francis II; HRE; 1792–1806
