= Montfaucon family =

Noble family, counts of Montbéliard

Montfaucon family House of Montfaucon
- Noble family
- Place of origin: Montfaucon, east of Besançon
- Founded: Mid-11th century (first record)
- Final head: Stephen of Montfaucon
- Members: Amadeus II of Montfaucon; Henry I of Montbéliard; Girard of Montfaucon; Henry II of Montfaucon; Henriette of Montbéliard
- Estates: County of Montbéliard (acquired 1162); Orbe; Échallens; Montagny-le-Corbe (now Montagny-près-Yverdon)

The Montfaucon family (de Montfaucon), or House of Montfaucon, was a noble family named after the castle of Montfaucon east of Besançon. Recorded from the middle of the 11th century, the family founded Lucelle Abbey in 1123–1124 and acquired the County of Montbéliard through marriage in 1162. It also held possessions in Vaud, among them Orbe, Échallens and Montagny-le-Corbe. After the death of Stephen of Montfaucon, the last member of the house, its estates were divided among his three granddaughters in 1397.

== History ==
The castle of Montfaucon, now in ruins, stood east of Besançon on a rocky summit above the Doubs. Its holders, the Montfaucon, are recorded in documents from the middle of the 11th century. In 1123–1124 they founded the Cistercian abbey of Lützel (Lucelle), and in 1162 they acquired the county of Montbéliard through marriage. Amadeus II (died 1195), the first count of Montbéliard from the house of Montfaucon, laid the foundation of the family's possessions in Vaud. In 1168 he acquired half of the lordship of Orbe from Emperor Frederick Barbarossa. He was also the first lord of Montagny-le-Corbe (now Montagny-près-Yverdon).

After the death of his son Richard III in 1227, Montbéliard passed to Theodoric III (died 1283), the grand baron. Montfaucon and the Vaud possessions of Orbe, Échallens and Montagny-le-Corbe went instead to Theodoric's brother Amadeus III (died 1276), the progenitor of the younger line, who also acquired the other half of Orbe in 1255. In 1282 Theodoric III made his great-granddaughter Guillemette of Neuchâtel and her husband, Reginald of Burgundy, his heirs to the county of Montbéliard. Reginald's daughter Agnes married Henry I (died 1367) of the younger line of the Montfaucon in 1320, and so brought the county of Montbéliard back to the house of Montfaucon.

The family's Vaud estates had been left to Henry's younger brother, Girard. (Note: Sources disagree: the HDS article on Henry II of Montfaucon, Henry I's grandson, calls him Girard's nephew.) As Girard had no children, his widow, Jaquette of Grandson, bequeathed these estates in 1379 to Henry I's son, Stephen of Montfaucon. Stephen was the last member of the house of Montfaucon, as his son Henry II fell at Nicopolis (now Nikopol, Bulgaria) in 1396. (Note: Sources disagree: the HDS article on Henry II of Montfaucon says his daughter Jeanne (died 1445) was the last member of the family.) When Stephen died, the family estate was divided among his three granddaughters in 1397. Henriette (died 1444) received Montbéliard and Margaret (died 1410) the Vaud possessions, while Johanna (died 1445), the third daughter of Henry II, obtained Montfaucon. After Margaret's early death in 1410, Johanna's husband, Louis II of Chalon-Arlay, gradually bought up the Vaud estates by 1418. The house of Chalon kept these possessions after Johanna's death, except for Oron and Palézieux, which had already passed to the count of Gruyère.

== Bibliography ==
- F. de Gingins-La Sarra, Recherches historiques sur les acquisitions des sires de Montfaucon et de la maison de Châlons dans le Pays-de-Vaud, 1857
- D. Schwennicke (ed.), Europäische Stammtafeln, new series, vol. 11, 1986, tables 134 f.
- R. Locatelli, "Les Montfaucon-Montbéliard du XIe siècle au milieu du XIIe siècle", in Bulletin de la Société d'émulation de Montbéliard, 121, 1998, pp. 5–49
- B. Andenmatten, La maison de Savoie et la noblesse vaudoise (XIIIe–XIVe s.), 2005, pp. 91–93
