= County of Ferrette =

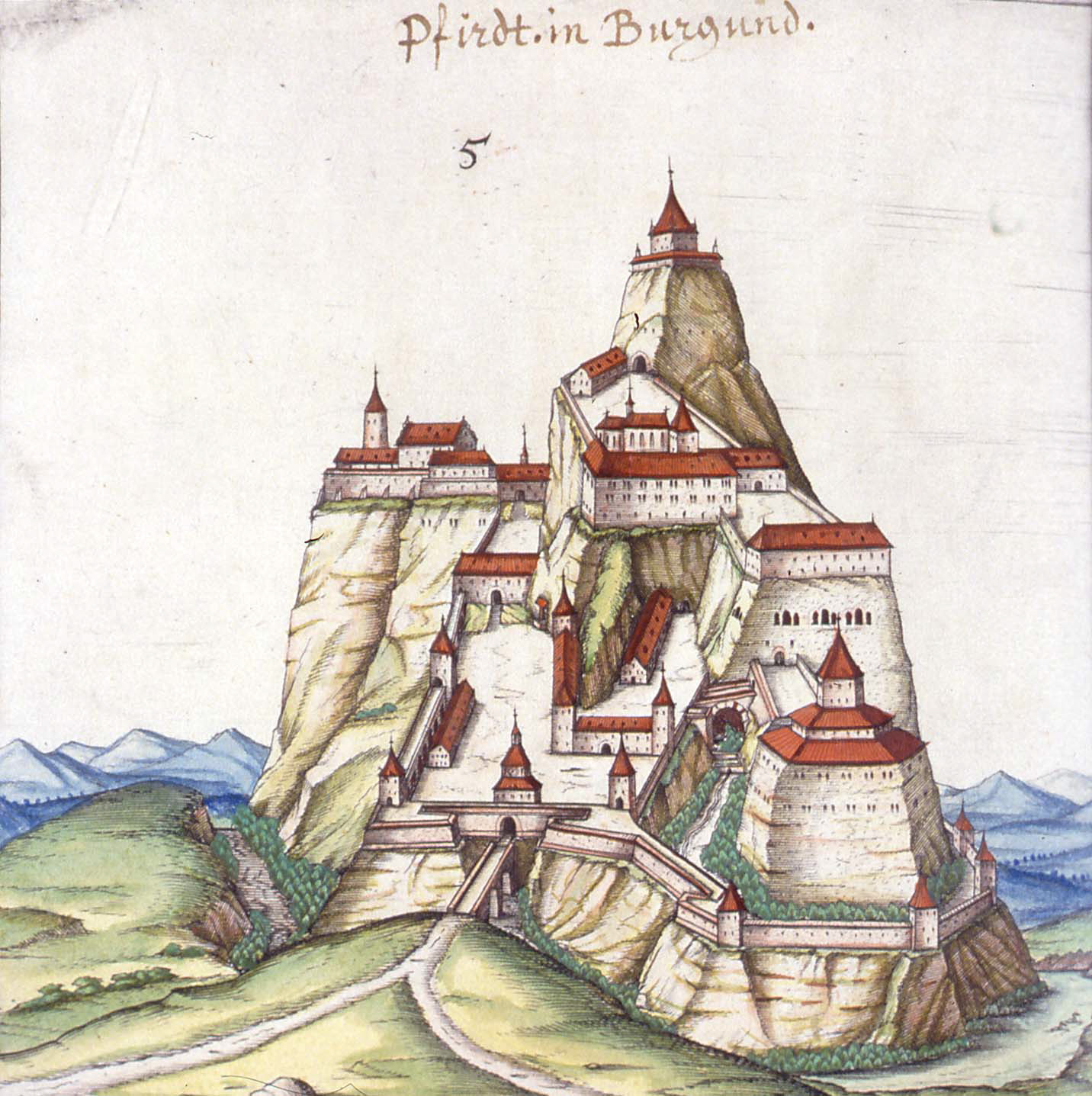
The castle of Ferrette, built in 1125, from a drawing of 1589.

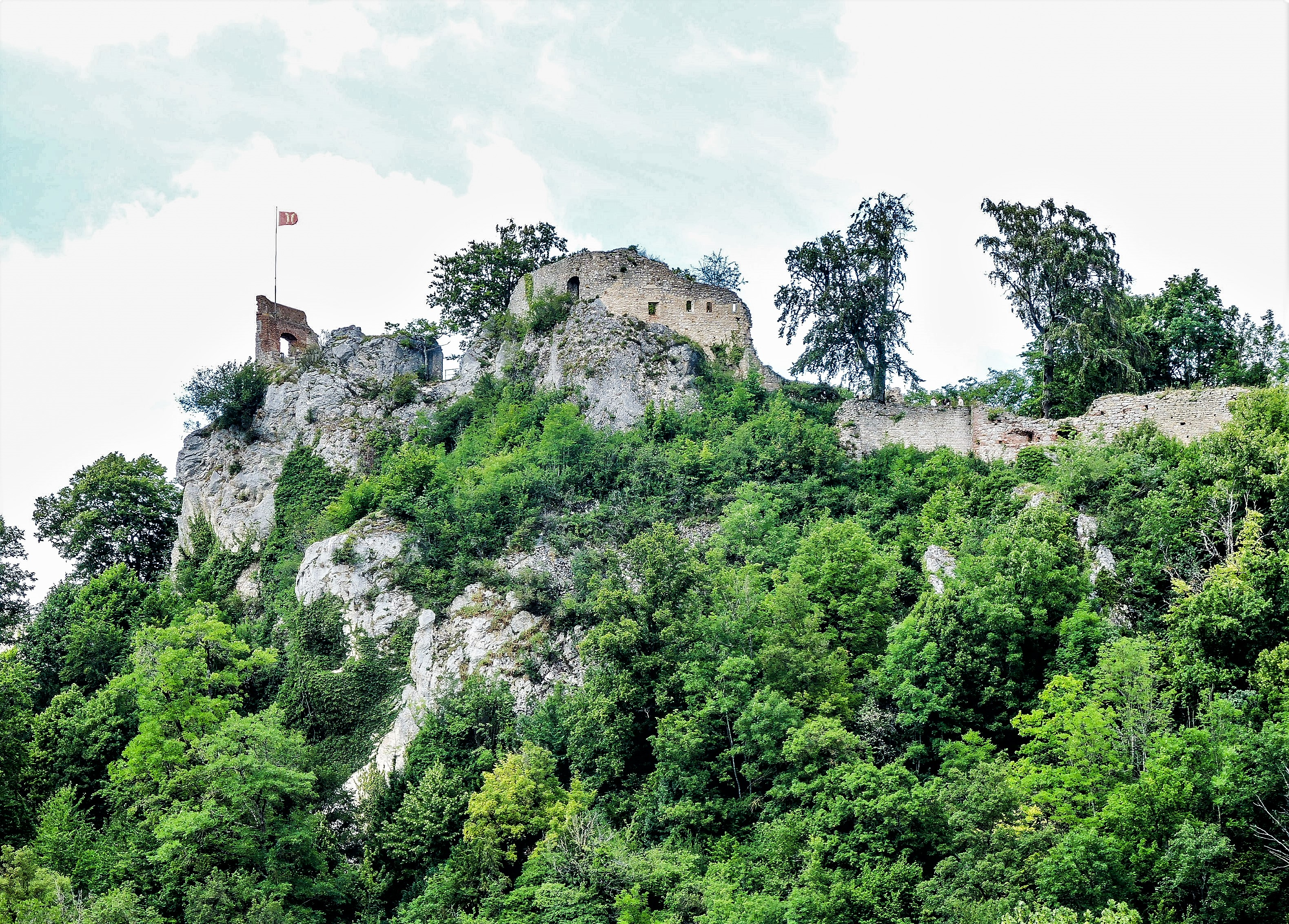
Ruins of the castle, seen in June 2020

The County of Ferrette (or Pfirt) was a feudal jurisdiction in Alsace in the Middle Ages and the early modern period. It roughly corresponds with the Sundgau and comprised the lordships of Ferrette (Pfirt), Altkirch, Thann, Belfort, Rougemont and others. These territories were not contiguous, but formed a patchwork of jurisdictions under the Holy Roman Empire.

The County of Ferrette emerged in the twelfth century alongside the County of Montbéliard as a division of the pagus of Elsgau, traditionally regarded as the southernmost pagus of Alsace. This was a Francophone region.

In the late Middle Ages, the County of Ferrette was the most westerly Habsburg possession and a part of Further Austria. It bordered the French Duchy of Burgundy and all four dukes of the House of Valois who ruled from 1363 until 1477 made efforts to acquire it. It was the object of a complicated series of marriage negotiations under the first duke, Philip the Bold. In 1387, Duke Leopold IV of Austria married Catherine, daughter of Philip the Bold, fulfilling an agreement first reached in 1378. For her dower she received some rents in the county and finally in 1403 the entire county, whose officers paid homage to her on 6 February 1404.

When Leopold died childless in 1411, he was succeeded by his brother, Frederick IV, who seized the county of Ferrette, leaving Catherine only two castles, one of which was Belfort. Catherine, however, claimed the whole county belonged to her. Her brother, Duke John the Fearless, garrisoned the castles on her behalf. These garrisons were small. To Belfort he sent only a castellan, nine squires, a cannoneer and some valets.

The dispute over Ferrette continued into the reign of John's son, Philip the Good. In 1420, he made an agreement with Catherine whereby he gave her an annual pension of 3,000 francs and promised to help recover the county in return for being named as her heir. Philip opened negotiations with Frederick, even threatening war in 1422–23, but made no progress. There were hostilities between Catherine's men and the Habsburgs' in those same years, but Frederick even managed to take back Belfort. Catherine died childless in 1425, but the Burgundian claim was not immediately or permanently dropped.

In 1427, a conference was held at Montbéliard (Moempelgard) whereat Amadeus VIII, Duke of Savoy, mediated the dispute. A treaty between the Archduke of Austria and the Duke of Burgundy seems to have been signed in mid-1428. Nevertheless, Ferrette, because it lay on the common border between the two houses, was as at the centre of the fighting in the brief Austro-Burgundian War of 1431. During the war, Philip's men successfully captured Belfort in a night attack. A truce was signed in October 1431 and a peace treaty in May 1432. In 1434, Philip bought up the claim of Catherine's sister, Margaret, to the county of Ferrette.

On 9 May 1469, by the Treaty of Saint-Omer, Archduke Sigismund of Austria mortgaged the County of Ferrette along with the Landgraviate of Upper Alsace to Duke Charles of Burgundy to secure a loan of 50,000 florins. By the terms of the loan, the principal as well as Charles's administrative expenses had to be repaid in a single lump sum, making it unlikely that the Habsburgs would ever discharge it. Charles's own power, however, was limited by the fact that many of the rights of the counts had been pawned by the Habsburgs. Ferrette itself, for example, was in pawn for 7,000 florins.

== List of counts ==
=== House of Scarponnois ===
1105–1160 Frederick I
1160–1191 Louis
1191–1233 Frederick II
1233–1275 Ulrich II
1275–1311/16 Theobald
1311/16–1324 Ulrich III
1324–1351/52 Joanna

=== House of Habsburg ===
The numbering of the Habsburgs is their family numbering.

1324–1358 Albert II
1358–1365 Rudolf IV
1365–1386 Leopold III
1386–1395 Albert III
1395–1406 Leopold IV
1406–1439 Frederick IV
1439–1469 Sigismund

=== House of Valois ===
1469–1477 Charles
1477–1482 Mary

=== House of Habsburg ===
1477–1519 Maximilian I
1519–1558 Charles V
1558–1564 Ferdinand I
1564–1595 Ferdinand II
1595–1619 Matthias
1619–1623 Ferdinand II
1623–1632 Leopold V
1632–1648 Ferdinand Charles
