= Joanna of Burgundy =

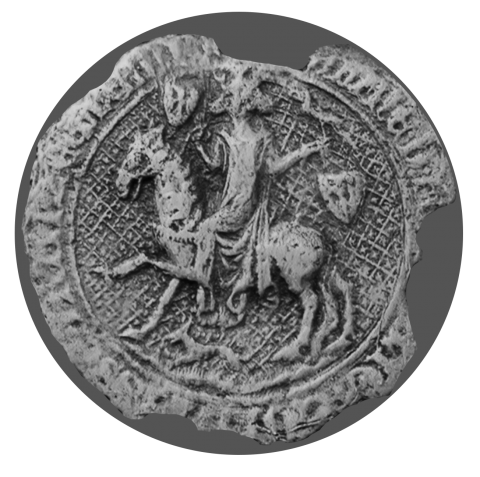
- Died: 1349
- Noble family: House of Chalon-Arlay
- Spouses: Ulrich III of Pfirt; Rudolf Hesso of Baden-Baden; William of Katzenelnbogen
- Father: Reginald of Burgundy
- Mother: Guillemette of Neufchâtel

Joanna of Burgundy (in French, Jeanne, c.a. 1293–1349) was a daughter of Reginald of Burgundy and his wife, Guillemette of Neufchâtel.

She married three times:

- With Ulrich III of Pfirt (d. 1324). They had two daughters:
  - Joanna (1300–1351), married Albert II, Duke of Austria
  - Ursula, married Hugo of Hohenberg
- With Rudolf Hesso of Baden-Baden (d. 1335), she had two more daughters:
  - Margaret (d. 1367), married her second cousin Frederick III of Baden-Baden (d. 1353)
  - Adelaide (died after 1399), married her second cousin Margrave Rudolf V of Baden-Pforzheim (brother of Frederick III; died in 1631) and later Count Walram IV of Tierstein (d. 1386)
- With William of Katzenelnbogen; this marriage remained childless.

When her brother Othenin, Count of Montbéliard died childless in 1339, she and her second husband Rudolf Hesso inherited the Lordships of Belfort and Héricourt.

After the death of her third husband, she divided her possessions amongst her four daughters. Margaret received Héricourt; Adelaide and Ursula shared Belfort.

Joanna of Burgundy died in December 1349 from the plague.
