= Joseph I, Holy Roman Emperor =

Holy Roman Emperor from 1705 to 1711

Joseph I
- Imperator Romanorum
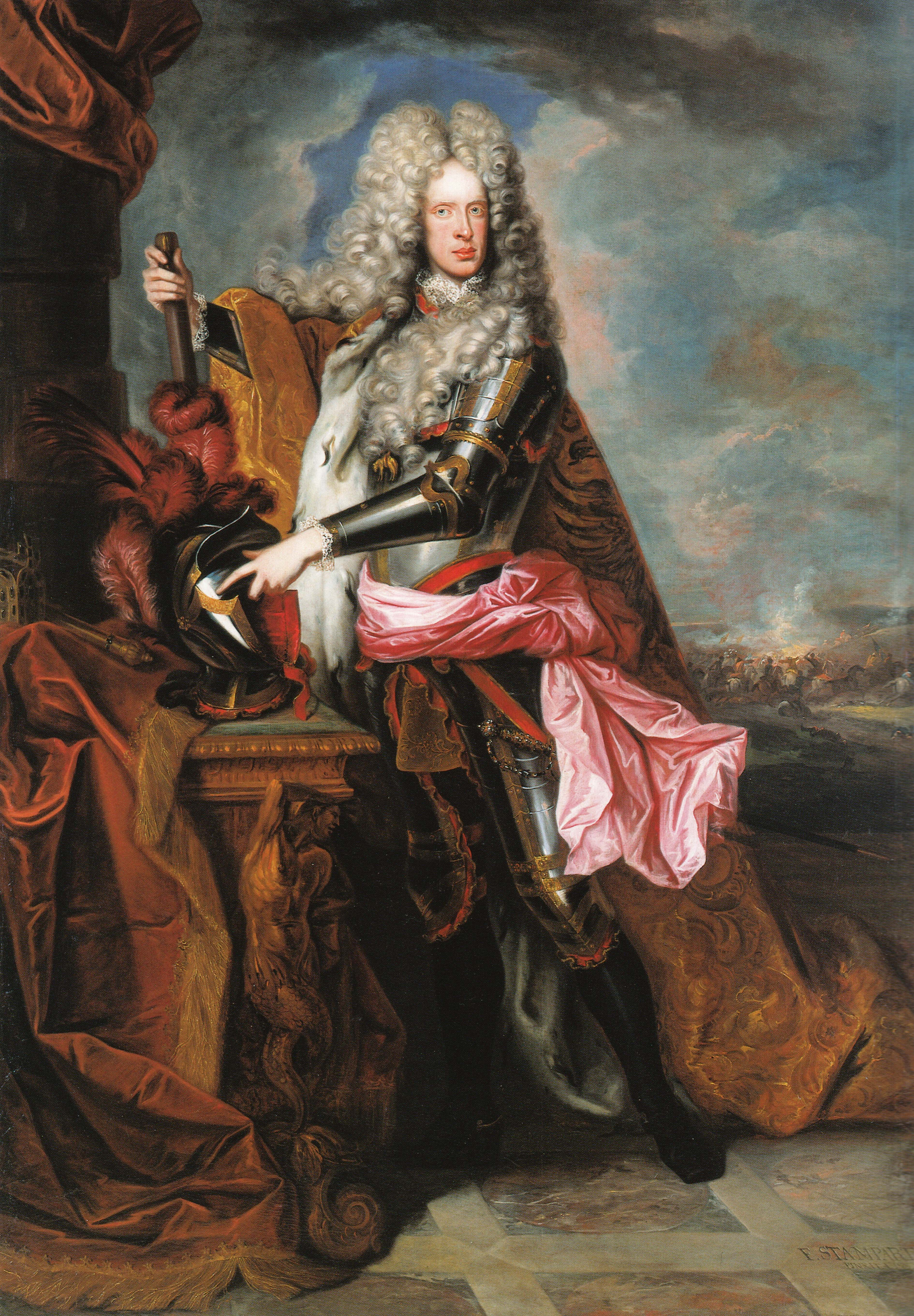
- Portrait by Frans van Stampart, c. 1705

Holy Roman Emperor
- Reign: 5 May 1705 – 17 April 1711
- Predecessor: Leopold I
- Successor: Charles VI

King of Hungary, Croatia and Slavonia
- Reign: 9 December 1687 – 17 April 1711
- Coronation: 9 December 1687
- Predecessor: Leopold I
- Successor: Charles III
- Co-ruler: Leopold I (1687–1705)

Archduke of Austria and King of Bohemia
- Reign: 5 May 1705 – 17 April 1711
- Predecessor: Leopold VI/I
- Successor: Charles III/II
- Born: 26 July 1678; Vienna, Archduchy of Austria, Holy Roman Empire
- Died: 17 April 1711 (aged 32); Vienna, Archduchy of Austria, Holy Roman Empire
- Burial: 20 April 1711; Imperial Crypt, Vienna
- Spouse: Wilhelmine Amalie of Brunswick (m. 1699)
- Issue: Maria Josepha of Austria; Archduke Leopold Joseph; Maria Amalia, Holy Roman Empress
Names
- German: Joseph Jacob Ignaz Johann Anton Eustachius
- House: House of Habsburg
- Father: Leopold I, Holy Roman Emperor
- Mother: Eleonore Magdalene of Neuburg
- Religion: Catholic Church

Joseph I (Joseph Jacob Ignaz Johann Anton Eustachius; 26 July 1678 – 17 April 1711) was Holy Roman Emperor and ruler of the Habsburg monarchy from 1705 until his death in 1711. He was the eldest son of Leopold I, Holy Roman Emperor from his third wife, Eleonor Magdalene of Neuburg. Joseph was crowned King of Hungary at the age of nine in 1687 and was elected King of the Romans at the age of eleven in 1690. He succeeded to the thrones of Bohemia and the Holy Roman Empire when his father died.

Joseph continued the War of the Spanish Succession, begun by his father against Louis XIV of France, in an attempt to make his younger brother Charles (later Emperor Charles VI) King of Spain. In the process, however, owing to the victories won by his military commander, Prince Eugene of Savoy, he did succeed in establishing Austrian hegemony over Italy. Joseph also had to contend with a protracted revolt in Hungary, fomented by Louis XIV. Neither conflict was resolved until the Treaty of Utrecht, after his death.

His motto was Amore et Timore (Latin for "Through Love and Fear"). Like his father and grandfather, he was a composer.

== Early life ==
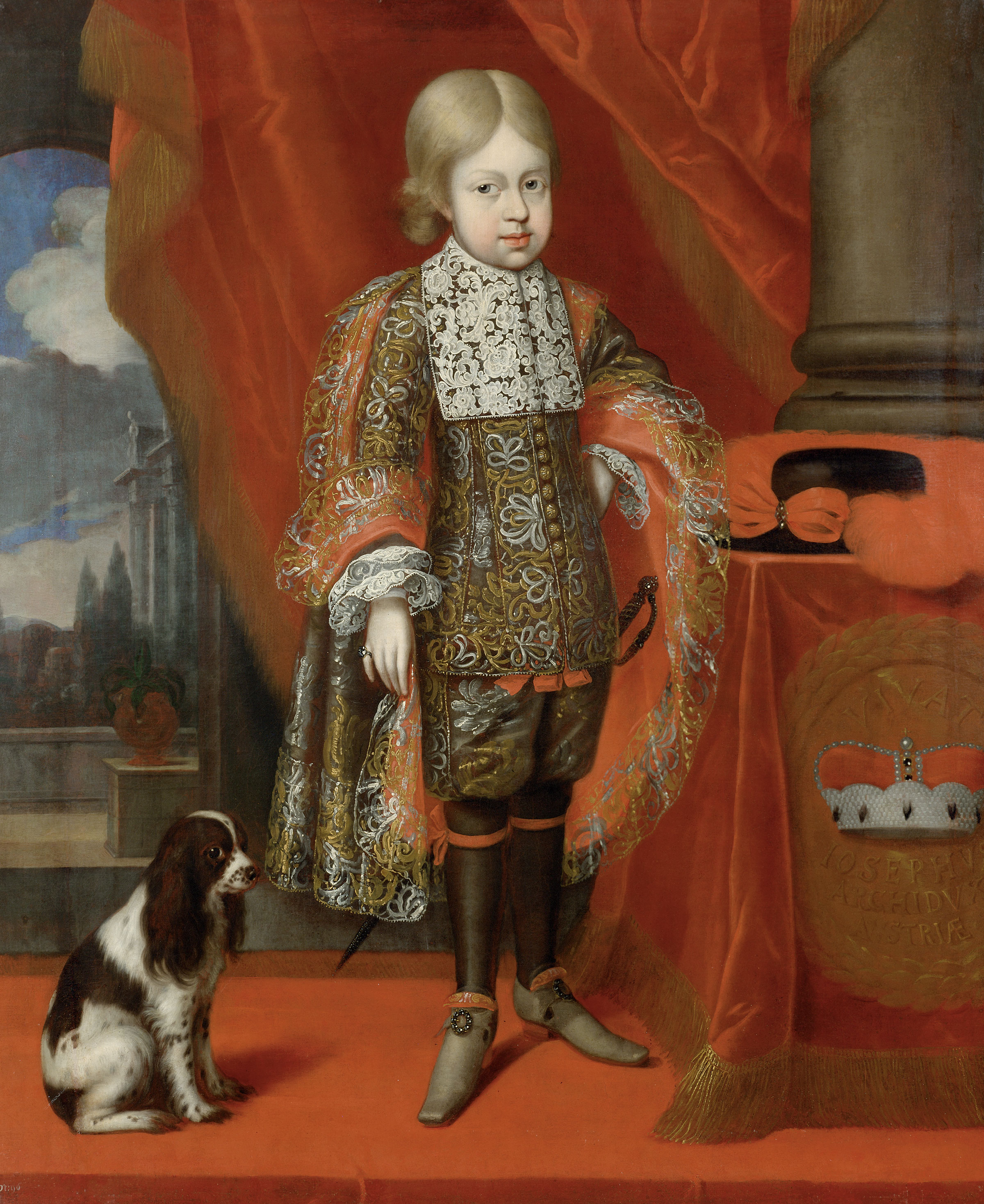
Archduke Joseph at the age of six (by Benjamin Block, 1684)

Born in Vienna, Joseph was educated strictly by Charles Theodore, Prince of Salm, and became a good linguist. Perhaps due to the influence of his formerly Protestant tutor he was a less devout Catholic than his parents and other relatives and developed into an adherent of the early Age of Enlightenment. He had two great enthusiasms: music and hunting.

Although Joseph was the first son and child born of his parents' marriage, he was his father's third son and seventh child. Previously, Leopold had been married to Infanta Margaret Theresa of Spain, who had given him four children, one of whom survived infancy. He then married Claudia Felicitas of Austria, who gave him two short-lived daughters. Thus, Joseph had six half-siblings. In 1684, the six-year-old Archduke had his first portrait painted by Benjamin Block. At the age of nine, on 9 December 1687, he was crowned King of Hungary, and at the age of eleven, on 23 January 1690, King of the Romans.

== Military service ==
In 1702, at the outbreak of the War of the Spanish Succession, Joseph saw his only military service. He joined the Imperial General, Louis William, Margrave of Baden-Baden, in the Siege of Landau.

== Holy Roman Emperor ==
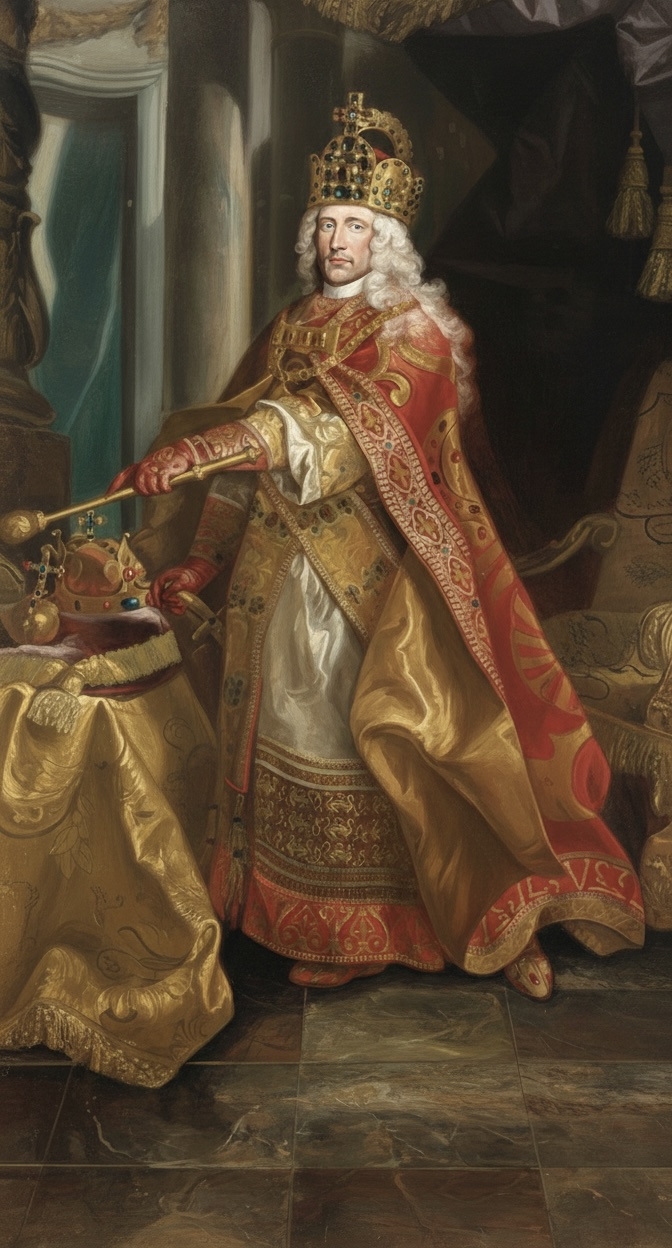
Joseph I by Johann Rudolf Huber, 1702

Prior to his ascension, Joseph had surrounded himself with reform-hungry advisors and the young court of Vienna was ambitious in the elaboration of innovative plans. He was described as a "forward-looking ruler". The large number of privy councillors was reduced and attempts were made to make the bureaucracy more efficient. Measures were taken to modernise the central bodies and a certain success was achieved in stabilising the chronically poor Habsburg finances. Joseph also endeavoured to strengthen his position in the Holy Roman Empire — as a means of strengthening Austria's standing as a great power. When he sought to lay claim to imperial rights in Italy and gain territories for the Habsburgs, he even risked a military conflict with the Pope over the Duchy of Mantua. Joseph I was threatened with excommunication by Pope Clement XI on 16 June 1708.

In Hungary, Joseph had inherited the kuruc rebellion of Francis II Rákóczi from his father Leopold I: once again, nobles in Transylvania (Siebenbürgen) had risen against Habsburg rule, even advancing for a time as far as Vienna. Although Joseph was compelled to take military action, he refrained — unlike his predecessors — from seeking to teach his subjects a lesson by executing the leaders. Instead, he agreed to a compromise peace, which in the long term facilitated the integration of Hungary into the Habsburg domains. It was his good fortune to govern the Austrian dominions and to be head of the Empire, during the years in which his trusted general, Prince Eugene of Savoy, either acting alone in Italy or with the Duke of Marlborough in Germany and Flanders, was beating the armies of King Louis XIV of France. During the whole of his reign, Hungary was disturbed by the conflict with Francis II Rákóczi, who eventually took refuge in the Ottoman Empire. The emperor reversed many of the authoritarian measures of his father, thus helping to placate opponents. He began the attempts to settle the question of the Austrian inheritance by a pragmatic sanction, which was continued by his brother Charles VI, Holy Roman Emperor.

=== Religious and ethnic policies ===
During the Rákóczi's rebellion (1703–1711) in the Kingdom of Hungary, Joseph's government was also faced with various religious and ethnic challenges. A significant portion of the Hungarian nobility and people belonged to the Reformed Church (Calvinists). Hoping to gain full religious freedom and equality, Hungarian Calvinists were supportive of Rákóczi's movement, thus forcing the imperial court in Vienna to reexamine some staunchly pro-Catholic policies. At the same time, eastern and southern regions of the Kingdom were also inhabited by Eastern Orthodox Christians, mainly Serbs and Romanians. In order to secure their loyalty, Joseph issued (in 1706) official confirmation of religious liberties that were previously granted to Eastern Orthodox subjects by his father, late emperor Leopold I. In 1708, Joseph confirmed the establishment of the Metropolitanate of Krušedol.

In 1710, Joseph extended his father's edict of outlawry against the Romani (Gypsies) in the Habsburg lands. Per Leopold, any Romani who entered the kingdom was to be declared an outlaw by letters patent. If the same person returned to Bohemia a second time, they were to be "treated with all possible severity". Joseph ordered that in the Kingdom of Bohemia they were to have their right ears cut off; in the Margraviate of Moravia, the left ear was to be cut off; in Austria, they would be branded on the back with a branding iron, representing the gallows. These mutilations were to enable the authorities to identify Romani who had been outlawed and returned. Joseph's edict specified "that all adult males were to be hanged without trial, whereas women and young males were to be flogged and banished forever." Officials who failed to enforce the edict could be fined 100 reichsthaler. Helping Romani was punishable by a half-year's forced labor. "Mass killings" of Romani were reported as a result.

== Death ==
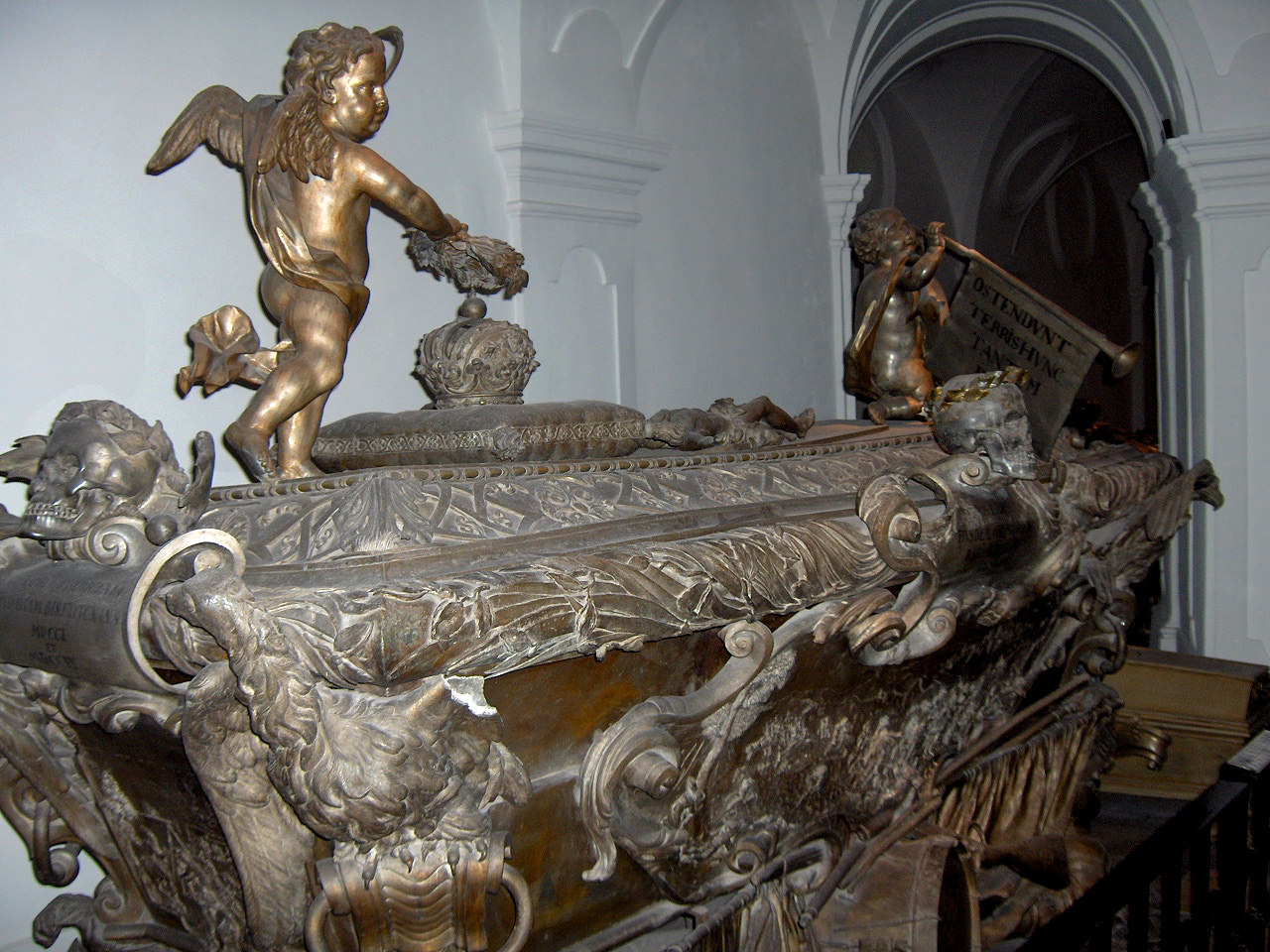
Tomb of the emperor in the Imperial Crypt, Vienna

During the smallpox epidemic of 1711, which killed Louis, Grand Dauphin and three siblings of the future Emperor Francis I, Joseph became infected. He died on 17 April in the Hofburg palace. He had previously promised his wife to stop having affairs, should he survive.

The Emperor was buried in the Imperial Crypt, the resting place of the majority of the Habsburgs. His funeral took place on 20 April, in tomb no. 35 in Karl's Vault. His tomb was designed by Johann Lukas von Hildebrandt, decorated with pictures of various battles from the War of Spanish Succession. Josefstadt (the eighth district of Vienna) is named for Joseph.

== Marriage and lack of heirs ==
On 24 February 1699, he married Wilhelmine Amalia of Brunswick-Lüneburg in Vienna. They had three children and their only son died of hydrocephalus before his first birthday. Joseph had a passion for love affairs (none of which resulted in illegitimate children) and he caught a sexually transmittable disease, probably syphilis, which he passed on to his wife while they were trying to produce a new heir. This incident rendered her sterile. Their father, who was still alive during these events, made Joseph and his brother Charles sign the Mutual Pact of Succession, under which Joseph's daughters would have precedence over Charles's daughters, in case neither fathered a son. This ruling, which made no provision for the accession of Charles's daughter Maria Theresa, led to the War of the Austrian Succession.

=== Issue ===
Name	Portrait	Lifespan	Notes
Maria Josepha; Queen of Poland		8 December 1699 – 17 November 1757	Archduchess of Austria, married Augustus III, King of Poland and Elector of Saxony
Leopold Joseph		29 October 1700 – 4 August 1701	Archduke of Austria, died in infancy
Maria Amalia; Holy Roman Empress		22 October 1701 – 11 December 1756	Archduchess of Austria, married Charles VII, Holy Roman Emperor

== Ancestors ==
Ancestors of Joseph I, Holy Roman Emperor

8. Ferdinand II, Holy Roman Emperor
4. Ferdinand III, Holy Roman Emperor
9. Maria Anna of Bavaria
2. Leopold I, Holy Roman Emperor
10. Philip III of Spain
5. Maria Anna of Spain
11. Margaret of Austria
1. Joseph I, Holy Roman Emperor
12. Wolfgang Wilhelm, Count Palatine of Neuburg
6. Philip William, Elector Palatine
13. Magdalene of Bavaria
3. Eleonore Magdalene of Neuburg
14. George II, Landgrave of Hesse-Darmstadt
7. Princess Elisabeth Amalie of Hesse-Darmstadt
15. Sophia Eleonore of Saxony

== Male-line family tree ==
House of Habsburg

Original line
Albert; Count of Habsburg c. 1188–1239
Rudolf I of Germany c. 1218–1291
Albert I of Germany; 1255–1308	Hartmann; 1263–1281	Rudolf II; Duke of Austria; 1270–1290
Rudolf I of Bohemia; 1281–1307	Frederick the Fair c. 1289–1330	Leopold I Duke of Austria; 1290–1326	Albert II; Duke of Austria; 1298–1358	Henry the Friendly; 1299–1327	Otto; Duke of Austria; 1301–1339	John; Parricida c. 1290–1312/1313
Albertinian line	Leopoldian line
Rudolf IV; Duke of Austria; 1339–1365	Frederick III; 1347–1362	Albert III; Duke of Austria; 1349–1395	Leopold III; Duke of Austria; 1351–1386	Frederick II; Duke of Austria; 1327–1344	Leopold II; Duke of Austria; 1328–1344
Albert IV; Duke of Austria; 1377–1404	William; Duke of Austria c. 1370–1406	Leopold IV; Duke of Austria; 1371–1411	Ernest; Duke of Austria; 1377–1424	Frederick IV; Duke of Austria; 1382–1439
Albert II of Germany; 1397–1439	Frederick III; HRE; 1415–1493	Albert VI; Archduke of Austria; 1418–1463	Sigismund; Archduke of Austria; 1427–1496
Ladislaus the Posthumous; 1440–1457	Maximilian I HRE; 1459–1519
Philip I of Castile; 1478–1506
Spanish / Iberian line	Austrian / HRE line
Charles V HRE; 1500–1558	Ferdinand I HRE; 1503–1564
Philip II of Spain; 1527–1598	Maximilian II; HRE; 1527–1576	Ferdinand II; Archduke of Austria; 1529–1595	Charles II; Archduke of Austria; 1540–1590
Carlos; Prince of Asturias; 1545–1568	Philip III of Spain; 1578–1621	Rudolf II; HRE; 1552–1612	Ernest of Austria; 1553–1595	Matthias; HRE; 1557–1619	Maximilian III; Archduke of Austria; 1558–1618	Albert VII; Archduke of Austria; 1559–1621	Wenceslaus; Archduke of Austria; 1561–1578	Andrew; Margrave of Burgau; 1558–1600	Charles; Margrave of Burgau; 1560–1618	Ferdinand II; HRE; 1578–1637	Maximilian Ernest of Austria; 1583–1616	Leopold V Archduke of Austria; 1586–1632	Charles of Austria; 1590–1624
Philip IV of Spain; 1605–1665	Charles of Austria; 1607–1632	Ferdinand of Austria; 1609–1641	John-Charles of Austria; 1605–1619	Ferdinand III; HRE; 1608–1657	Leopold Wilhelm of Austria; 1614–1662	Ferdinand Charles; Archduke of Austria; 1628–1662	Sigismund Francis; Archduke of Austria; 1630–1665
Balthasar Charles; Prince of Asturias; 1629–1646	Charles II of Spain; 1661–1700	Ferdinand IV; King of the Romans; 1633–1654	Leopold I HRE; 1640–1705	Charles Joseph of Austria; 1649–1664
Joseph I HRE; 1678–1711	Charles VI; HRE; 1685–1740
Lorraine
Maria Theresa; HRE; 1740–1780	Francis I HRE; 1745–1765
Habsburg-Lorraine
Joseph II; HRE; 1765–1790	Leopold II; HRE; 1790–1792
Francis II; HRE; 1792–1806

== Bibliography ==
- Ćirković, Sima (2004). The Serbs. Malden: Blackwell Publishing. ISBN 978-1-4051-4291-5.
- Herchenhahn, J. C. Geschichte der Regierung Kaiser Josephs I (1786–1789)
- Hochedlinger, Michael (2013). Austria's Wars of Emergence: War, State and Society in the Habsburg Monarchy, 1683–1797. London & New York: Routledge. ISBN 978-1-317-88793-5.
- Ingrao, Charles W. (1979). In Quest and Crisis: Emperor Joseph I and the Habsburg Monarchy. West Lafayette: Purdue University Press. ISBN 978-0-911198-53-9.
- Krones von Marchiand, F. Grundriss der österreichischen Geschichte (1882).
- van Noorden, C. Europäische Geschichte im achtzehnten Jahrhundert (1870–1882).
- Wagner, F. Historia Josephi Caesaris (1746).

Joseph I, Holy Roman Emperor House of Habsburg Born: 26 July 1678 Died: 17 April 1711
Regnal titles
Preceded by Emperor Leopold I	Holy Roman Emperor; King of Bohemia; Archduke of Austria; Duke of Teschen; 1705 – 1711	Succeeded by Emperor Charles VI
Preceded by Emperor Leopold I	King of the Romans; King in Germany; 1690 – 1711 with Leopold I, Holy Roman Emperor (1690 – 1705)	Succeeded by Emperor Charles VI
Preceded by Emperor Leopold I	King of Hungary, Croatia and Slavonia; 1687 – 1711 with Leopold I, Holy Roman Emperor (1687 – 1705)	Succeeded by Emperor Charles VI
