= Infante Carlos of Spain (1607–1632) =

Spanish prince

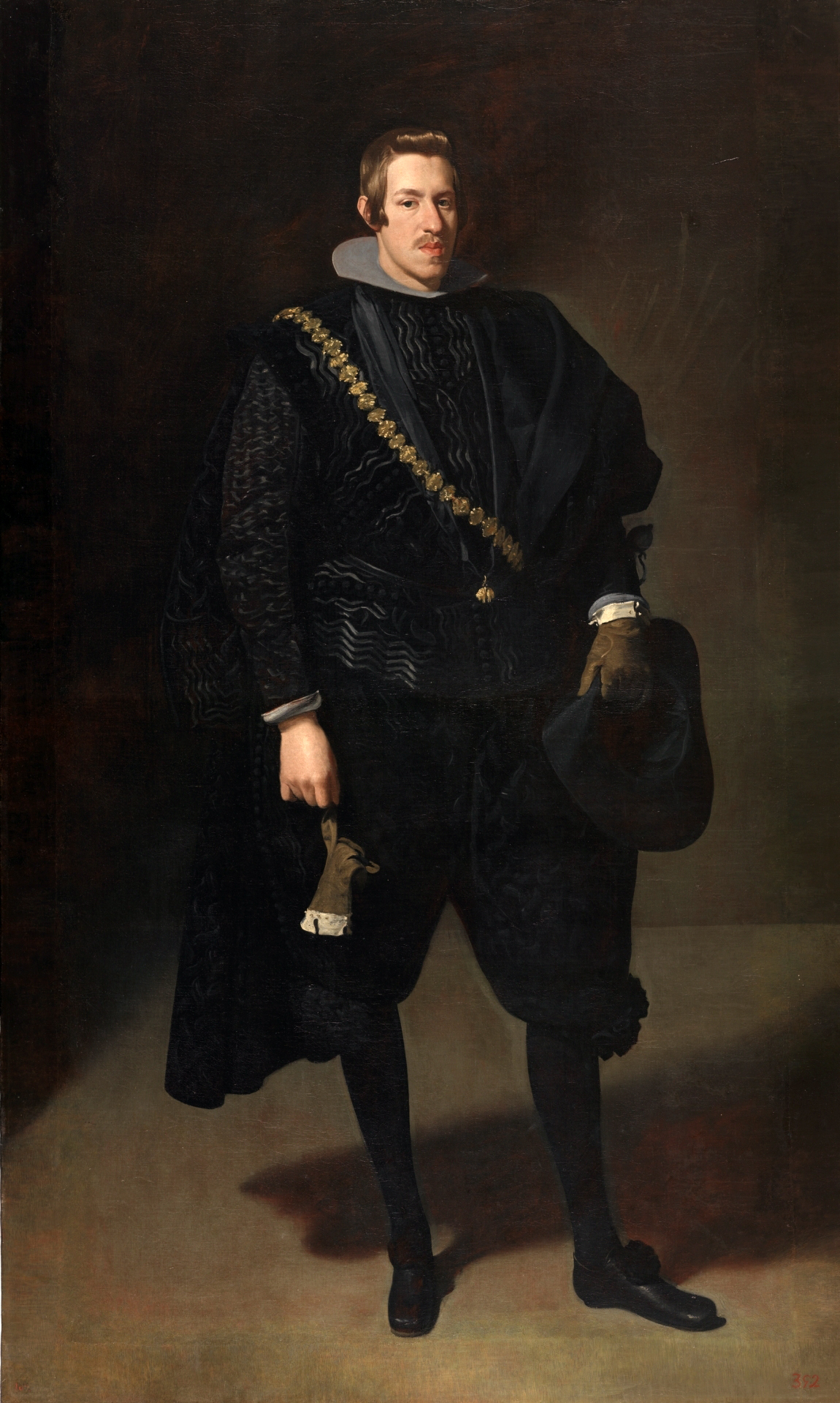
- Portrait by Diego Velázquez, 1627
- Born: 15 September 1607
- Died: 30 July 1632 (aged 24)
- Burial: El Escorial
- House: Habsburg
- Father: Philip III of Spain
- Mother: Margaret of Austria

Infante Carlos of Spain (15 September 1607 – 30 July 1632), was the second son of King Philip III of Spain and his queen consort, Margaret of Austria.

== Life ==
Infante Carlos was the younger brother of Philip IV, and, as long as the King remained childless, was heir to the Spanish throne. Carlos was never a friend of Philip's favourite and prime minister, the Count-Duke of Olivares, and though he was uninterested in politics, he was used by various nobles in attempts to overthrow Olivares.

During his brother's severest illness, Carlos was on the point of ascending the throne, but Felipe recovered and in 1629 finally fathered a son, Balthasar Carlos. This dissipated Carlos's political importance completely.

Contemporaries described Infante Carlos as prudent and liberal and he seemed to have been a "vigilant observer of royal customs". Unlike his brother Fernando, who was assigned a role at an early age, he remained in a child-like position until his mid-twenties. Although he received official visits and expressed political opinions, he remained without an own household, remaining in the household of the king.

Carlos died in 1632, aged 24. Francisco de Quevedo dedicated a sonnet entitled The Burial of the Most Serene Infante Don Carlos to this event.

Arms of Charles of Austria

== Ancestry ==
Ancestors of Infante Carlos of Spain (1607–1632)

8. Charles V, Holy Roman Emperor
4. Philip II of Spain
9. Isabella of Portugal
2. Philip III of Spain
10. Maximilian II, Holy Roman Emperor
5. Anna of Austria
11. Maria of Austria
1. Charles of Austria
12. Ferdinand I, Holy Roman Emperor
6. Charles II, Archduke of Austria
13. Anne of Bohemia and Hungary
3. Margaret of Austria
14. Albert V, Duke of Bavaria
7. Maria Anna of Bavaria
15. Anna of Austria

== Male-line family tree ==
House of Habsburg

Original line
Albert; Count of Habsburg c. 1188–1239
Rudolf I of Germany c. 1218–1291
Albert I of Germany; 1255–1308 | Hartmann; 1263–1281 | Rudolf II; Duke of Austria; 1270–1290
Rudolf I of Bohemia; 1281–1307 | Frederick the Fair c. 1289–1330 | Leopold I Duke of Austria; 1290–1326 | Albert II; Duke of Austria; 1298–1358 | Henry the Friendly; 1299–1327 | Otto; Duke of Austria; 1301–1339 | John; Parricida c. 1290–1312/1313
Albertinian line | Leopoldian line
Rudolf IV; Duke of Austria; 1339–1365 | Frederick III; 1347–1362 | Albert III; Duke of Austria; 1349–1395 | Leopold III; Duke of Austria; 1351–1386 | Frederick II; Duke of Austria; 1327–1344 | Leopold II; Duke of Austria; 1328–1344
Albert IV; Duke of Austria; 1377–1404 | William; Duke of Austria c. 1370–1406 | Leopold IV; Duke of Austria; 1371–1411 | Ernest; Duke of Austria; 1377–1424 | Frederick IV; Duke of Austria; 1382–1439
Albert II of Germany; 1397–1439 | Frederick III; HRE; 1415–1493 | Albert VI; Archduke of Austria; 1418–1463 | Sigismund; Archduke of Austria; 1427–1496
Ladislaus the Posthumous; 1440–1457 | Maximilian I HRE; 1459–1519
Philip I of Castile; 1478–1506
Spanish / Iberian line | Austrian / HRE line
Charles V HRE; 1500–1558 | Ferdinand I HRE; 1503–1564
Philip II of Spain; 1527–1598 | Maximilian II; HRE; 1527–1576 | Ferdinand II; Archduke of Austria; 1529–1595 | Charles II; Archduke of Austria; 1540–1590
Carlos; Prince of Asturias; 1545–1568 | Philip III of Spain; 1578–1621 | Rudolf II; HRE; 1552–1612 | Ernest of Austria; 1553–1595 | Matthias; HRE; 1557–1619 | Maximilian III; Archduke of Austria; 1558–1618 | Albert VII; Archduke of Austria; 1559–1621 | Wenceslaus; Archduke of Austria; 1561–1578 | Andrew; Margrave of Burgau; 1558–1600 | Charles; Margrave of Burgau; 1560–1618 | Ferdinand II; HRE; 1578–1637 | Maximilian Ernest of Austria; 1583–1616 | Leopold V Archduke of Austria; 1586–1632 | Charles of Austria; 1590–1624
Philip IV of Spain; 1605–1665 | Charles of Austria; 1607–1632 | Ferdinand of Austria; 1609–1641 | John-Charles of Austria; 1605–1619 | Ferdinand III; HRE; 1608–1657 | Leopold Wilhelm of Austria; 1614–1662 | Ferdinand Charles; Archduke of Austria; 1628–1662 | Sigismund Francis; Archduke of Austria; 1630–1665
Balthasar Charles; Prince of Asturias; 1629–1646 | Charles II of Spain; 1661–1700 | Ferdinand IV; King of the Romans; 1633–1654 | Leopold I HRE; 1640–1705 | Charles Joseph of Austria; 1649–1664
Joseph I HRE; 1678–1711 | Charles VI; HRE; 1685–1740
Lorraine
Maria Theresa; HRE; 1740–1780 | Francis I HRE; 1745–1765
Habsburg-Lorraine
Joseph II; HRE; 1765–1790 | Leopold II; HRE; 1790–1792
Francis II; HRE; 1792–1806
