= Albert IV of Habsburg =

Progenitor of the House of Habsburg

Albert IV, Count of Habsburg
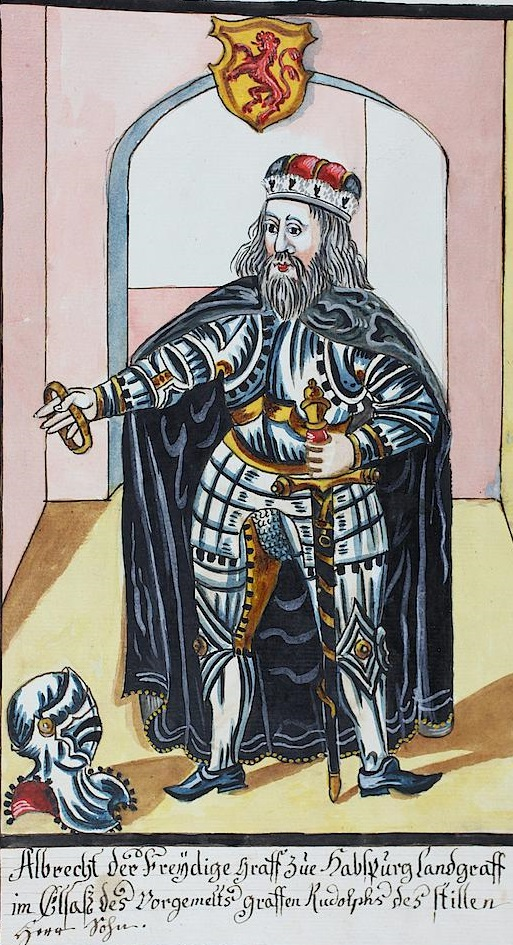
- Reign: 10 April 1232 – 13 December 1239
- Born: c. 1188
- Died: 13 December 1239; Ashkelon
- Noble family: House of Habsburg
- Spouses: Hedwig of Kyburg; Anna of Zähringen
- Issue: Rudolf I of Germany
- Father: Rudolph II, Count of Habsburg
- Mother: Agnes of Staufen

Albert IV (or Albert the Wise) (c. 1188 – December 13, 1239) was Count of Habsburg in the Aargau and a progenitor of the royal House of Habsburg.

He was the son of Count Rudolph II of Habsburg and Agnes of Staufen. About 1217, Albert married Hedwig (Heilwig), daughter of Count Ulrich of Kyburg (died 1237) and Anna of Zähringen. He was present at the signing of the Golden Bull of Rimini in March 1226. Upon the death of his father in 1232, he divided his family's estates with his brother Rudolph III, whereby he retained the ancestral seat at Habsburg Castle. A follower of Emperor Frederick II of Hohenstaufen, he took part in the Barons' Crusade of 1239 with King Theobald I of Navarre and died near Ashkelon.

Albert was the father of King Rudolf I of Germany.

A cause for Albert's beatification in the Catholic Church was opened on 4 September 1908, and he was declared a Servant of God.

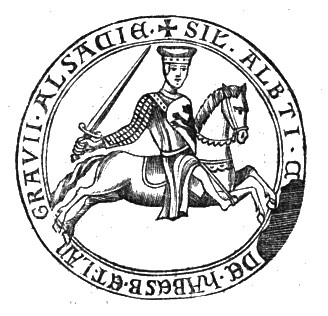
Seal of Albert IV, Count of Habsburg, inscribed in Latin (with abbreviations): SIGILLUM ALBERTI (COMIS) DE HABESB(URG) ET LANGRAVII ALSACTIAE ("seal of Albert of Habsburg, Count of Habsburg and Langrave of Alsace")

Coat-of-arms of the count of Habsburg

== Male-line family tree ==
House of Habsburg

Original line
Albert; Count of Habsburg c. 1188–1239
Rudolf I of Germany c. 1218–1291
Albert I of Germany; 1255–1308	Hartmann; 1263–1281	Rudolf II; Duke of Austria; 1270–1290
Rudolf I of Bohemia; 1281–1307	Frederick the Fair c. 1289–1330	Leopold I Duke of Austria; 1290–1326	Albert II; Duke of Austria; 1298–1358	Henry the Friendly; 1299–1327	Otto; Duke of Austria; 1301–1339	John; Parricida c. 1290–1312/1313
Albertinian line	Leopoldian line
Rudolf IV; Duke of Austria; 1339–1365	Frederick III; 1347–1362	Albert III; Duke of Austria; 1349–1395	Leopold III; Duke of Austria; 1351–1386	Frederick II; Duke of Austria; 1327–1344	Leopold II; Duke of Austria; 1328–1344
Albert IV; Duke of Austria; 1377–1404	William; Duke of Austria c. 1370–1406	Leopold IV; Duke of Austria; 1371–1411	Ernest; Duke of Austria; 1377–1424	Frederick IV; Duke of Austria; 1382–1439
Albert II of Germany; 1397–1439	Frederick III; HRE; 1415–1493	Albert VI; Archduke of Austria; 1418–1463	Sigismund; Archduke of Austria; 1427–1496
Ladislaus the Posthumous; 1440–1457	Maximilian I HRE; 1459–1519
Philip I of Castile; 1478–1506
Spanish / Iberian line	Austrian / HRE line
Charles V HRE; 1500–1558	Ferdinand I HRE; 1503–1564
Philip II of Spain; 1527–1598	Maximilian II; HRE; 1527–1576	Ferdinand II; Archduke of Austria; 1529–1595	Charles II; Archduke of Austria; 1540–1590
Carlos; Prince of Asturias; 1545–1568	Philip III of Spain; 1578–1621	Rudolf II; HRE; 1552–1612	Ernest of Austria; 1553–1595	Matthias; HRE; 1557–1619	Maximilian III; Archduke of Austria; 1558–1618	Albert VII; Archduke of Austria; 1559–1621	Wenceslaus; Archduke of Austria; 1561–1578	Andrew; Margrave of Burgau; 1558–1600	Charles; Margrave of Burgau; 1560–1618	Ferdinand II; HRE; 1578–1637	Maximilian Ernest of Austria; 1583–1616	Leopold V Archduke of Austria; 1586–1632	Charles of Austria; 1590–1624
Philip IV of Spain; 1605–1665	Charles of Austria; 1607–1632	Ferdinand of Austria; 1609–1641	John-Charles of Austria; 1605–1619	Ferdinand III; HRE; 1608–1657	Leopold Wilhelm of Austria; 1614–1662	Ferdinand Charles; Archduke of Austria; 1628–1662	Sigismund Francis; Archduke of Austria; 1630–1665
Balthasar Charles; Prince of Asturias; 1629–1646	Charles II of Spain; 1661–1700	Ferdinand IV; King of the Romans; 1633–1654	Leopold I HRE; 1640–1705	Charles Joseph of Austria; 1649–1664
Joseph I HRE; 1678–1711	Charles VI; HRE; 1685–1740
Lorraine
Maria Theresa; HRE; 1740–1780	Francis I HRE; 1745–1765
Habsburg-Lorraine
Joseph II; HRE; 1765–1790	Leopold II; HRE; 1790–1792
Francis II; HRE; 1792–1806

== Sources ==
- Berenger, Jean (2013). Simpson, C.A. (ed.). A History of the Habsburg Empire 1273-1700. Routledge.
- Emerton, Ephraim (1917). The Beginnings of Modern Europe (1250-1450). Ginn and Company.

Albert IV of Habsburg House of Habsburg Born: 1188 Died: 1239
Regnal titles
Preceded by Rudolph II	Count of Habsburg; 1232–1239 with Rudolph III as co-ruler	Succeeded by Rudolph IV
