= Archduke Wenceslaus of Austria =

German prince (1561-1578)

Wenceslaus of Austria
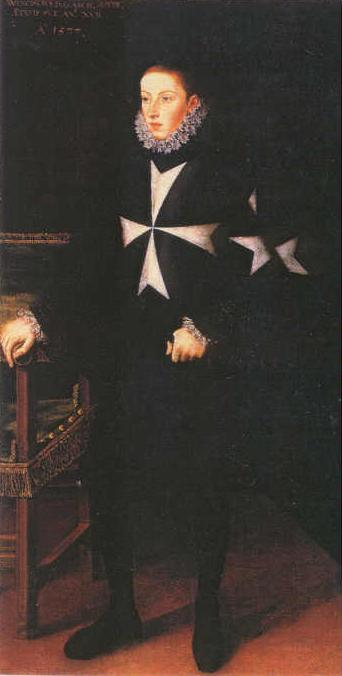
- Portrait of Archduke Wenceslaus as Grand Prior of the Order of Malta, by Alonso Sanchez Coello, 1577
- Born: 9 March 1561; Wiener Neustadt
- Died: 22 September 1578 (aged 17); Madrid
- Burial: El Escorial
- House: Habsburg
- Father: Maximilian II, Holy Roman Emperor
- Mother: Maria of Spain

Archduke Wenceslaus of Austria (9 March 1561 – 22 September 1578), was a German prince and member of the House of Habsburg. In 1577, he was appointed the Grand Prior of the Order of Malta in Castile.

He was the son of Maximilian II, Holy Roman Emperor, and his wife, Maria of Spain.

== Life ==
Born in Wiener Neustadt, Wenceslaus was the eleventh child and eighth son of his parents' sixteen children. Only nine of the children survived early infancy. He grew up mostly in the court of Philip II of Spain with several of his siblings. In 1577, Wenceslaus was appointed Grand Prior of the Order of Malta in Castile, but died suddenly one year later in Madrid at age seventeen. He was buried in the Panteon de los Infantes in the Real Monasterio de San Lorenzo de El Escorial in October that year.

== Ancestry ==
Ancestors of Archduke Wenceslaus of Austria

8. Philip I, King of Castile
4. Ferdinand I, Holy Roman Emperor
9. Joanna, Queen of Castile
2. Maximilian II, Holy Roman Emperor
10. Vladislas II, King of Bohemia and Hungary
5. Anne of Bohemia and Hungary
11. Anne of Foix-Candale
1. Archduke Wenceslaus of Austria
12. Philip I, King of Castile (= 8)
6. Charles V, Holy Roman Emperor
13. Joanna, Queen of Castile (= 9)
3. Maria of Austria
14. Manuel I, King of Portugal
7. Isabella of Portugal
15. Maria of Aragon

== Male-line family tree ==
House of Habsburg

Original line
Albert; Count of Habsburg c. 1188–1239
Rudolf I of Germany c. 1218–1291
Albert I of Germany; 1255–1308	Hartmann; 1263–1281	Rudolf II; Duke of Austria; 1270–1290
Rudolf I of Bohemia; 1281–1307	Frederick the Fair c. 1289–1330	Leopold I Duke of Austria; 1290–1326	Albert II; Duke of Austria; 1298–1358	Henry the Friendly; 1299–1327	Otto; Duke of Austria; 1301–1339	John; Parricida c. 1290–1312/1313
Albertinian line	Leopoldian line
Rudolf IV; Duke of Austria; 1339–1365	Frederick III; 1347–1362	Albert III; Duke of Austria; 1349–1395	Leopold III; Duke of Austria; 1351–1386	Frederick II; Duke of Austria; 1327–1344	Leopold II; Duke of Austria; 1328–1344
Albert IV; Duke of Austria; 1377–1404	William; Duke of Austria c. 1370–1406	Leopold IV; Duke of Austria; 1371–1411	Ernest; Duke of Austria; 1377–1424	Frederick IV; Duke of Austria; 1382–1439
Albert II of Germany; 1397–1439	Frederick III; HRE; 1415–1493	Albert VI; Archduke of Austria; 1418–1463	Sigismund; Archduke of Austria; 1427–1496
Ladislaus the Posthumous; 1440–1457	Maximilian I HRE; 1459–1519
Philip I of Castile; 1478–1506
Spanish / Iberian line	Austrian / HRE line
Charles V HRE; 1500–1558	Ferdinand I HRE; 1503–1564
Philip II of Spain; 1527–1598	Maximilian II; HRE; 1527–1576	Ferdinand II; Archduke of Austria; 1529–1595	Charles II; Archduke of Austria; 1540–1590
Carlos; Prince of Asturias; 1545–1568	Philip III of Spain; 1578–1621	Rudolf II; HRE; 1552–1612	Ernest of Austria; 1553–1595	Matthias; HRE; 1557–1619	Maximilian III; Archduke of Austria; 1558–1618	Albert VII; Archduke of Austria; 1559–1621	Wenceslaus; Archduke of Austria; 1561–1578	Andrew; Margrave of Burgau; 1558–1600	Charles; Margrave of Burgau; 1560–1618	Ferdinand II; HRE; 1578–1637	Maximilian Ernest of Austria; 1583–1616	Leopold V Archduke of Austria; 1586–1632	Charles of Austria; 1590–1624
Philip IV of Spain; 1605–1665	Charles of Austria; 1607–1632	Ferdinand of Austria; 1609–1641	John-Charles of Austria; 1605–1619	Ferdinand III; HRE; 1608–1657	Leopold Wilhelm of Austria; 1614–1662	Ferdinand Charles; Archduke of Austria; 1628–1662	Sigismund Francis; Archduke of Austria; 1630–1665
Balthasar Charles; Prince of Asturias; 1629–1646	Charles II of Spain; 1661–1700	Ferdinand IV; King of the Romans; 1633–1654	Leopold I HRE; 1640–1705	Charles Joseph of Austria; 1649–1664
Joseph I HRE; 1678–1711	Charles VI; HRE; 1685–1740
Lorraine
Maria Theresa; HRE; 1740–1780	Francis I HRE; 1745–1765
Habsburg-Lorraine
Joseph II; HRE; 1765–1790	Leopold II; HRE; 1790–1792
Francis II; HRE; 1792–1806
