= Albertinian Line =

The Albertinian line was a line of the Habsburg dynasty that was begun by Duke Albert III of Austria, who, after death of his elder brother, Rudolf IV, divided the Habsburg hereditary lands with his brother Leopold III by the 1379 Treaty of Neuberg. The branch finally became extinct in the male line with the early death of Ladislaus the Posthumous in 1457.

== History ==
According to the terms of a treaty, Albert was the ruler over the Duchy of Austria proper, and the southern territories (Inner Austria) were ruled by his brother, Leopold III, an ancestor of the Leopoldian line. Albert ruled over Austria until his death in 1395. His only son and heir, also called Albert, took the rule over his territories as Albert IV and quickly came to terms with his Leopoldian cousins William, Leopold IV, Ernest and Frederick IV. When Albert IV died in 1404 he left a minor son - Duke Albert V of Austria, who remained under the tutelage of his Leopoldine uncles William (until 1406) and Leopold IV (until 1411).

Having assumed the rule over Austria, Albert V in 1421 married Elizabeth of Luxembourg, the only child of Emperor Sigismund. After Sigismund's death in 1437, he was crowned King of Hungary and King of Bohemia. In 1438, he also was elected King of the Romans (as Albert II) and Emperor-to-be, anticipating the powers of the later Habsburg monarchy, but he died the next year. The Hungarian throne passed to Polish king Władysław III against the fierce resistance of Albert's widow, Elizabeth.

Albert had left a son, who was born only after his death and so is known as Ladislaus the Posthumous. Ladislaus had to wait for many years to start governing his territories.

The heir of both the Kingdom of Bohemia and the Kingdom of Hungary, he remained under the tutelage of his Leopoldian cousin Frederick V, who in 1440 had been elected King of the Romans upon Albert's death. Ladislaus' claims to Hungary were acknowledged after King Władysław had been killed at the 1444 Battle of Varna. However, Ladislaus became the real ruler only after the death of Regent John Hunyadi in 1456. As Ladislaus had no children, his sudden death in 1457 ended the history of the Albertinian line. Its holdings in Austria reverted to his second cousin Duke Frederick V.

== Genealogy ==
1. Albert III with the Pigtail (1349–1395), Duke of Austria from 1365 until his death, Duke of Styria, Carinthia, Carniola and Count of Tyrol (jointly with his brother Leopold III) until 1379
  X (1) Elizabeth of Luxembourg (1358–1373), daughter of Emperor Charles IV, Holy Roman Emperor
  X (2) Beatrice of Hohenzollern (c. 1362–1414), daughter of Burgrave Frederick V of Nuremberg
  1. (2) Albert IV the Patient (1377–1404), Duke of Austria from 1395 until his death
    X Joanna Sophia of Wittelsbach (c.1373–1410), daughter of Duke Albert I of Bavaria
    1. Margaret (1395–1447)
      X Duke Henry XVI of Bavaria
    2. Albert V the Magnanimous (1397–1439), Duke of Austria from 1404, King of Hungary from 1437, King of Bohemia and King of the Romans (as Albert II) from 1438 until his death
      X Elizabeth of Luxembourg (1409–1442), daughter of Emperor Sigismund, King of Bohemia and Hungary
      1. Anne (1432–1462)
        X Landgrave William III of Thuringia
      2. George (1435)
      3. Elizabeth (1436–1505)
        X Casimir IV Jagiellon, Grand Duke of Lithuania and King of Poland
      4. Ladislaus the Posthumous (1440–1457), Duke of Austria from 1440, King of Hungary (as Ladislaus V) from 1444 and King of Bohemia from 1453 until his death

Line extinct

== Male-line family tree ==
House of Habsburg

Original line
Albert; Count of Habsburg c. 1188–1239
Rudolf I of Germany c. 1218–1291
Albert I of Germany; 1255–1308	Hartmann; 1263–1281	Rudolf II; Duke of Austria; 1270–1290
Rudolf I of Bohemia; 1281–1307	Frederick the Fair c. 1289–1330	Leopold I Duke of Austria; 1290–1326	Albert II; Duke of Austria; 1298–1358	Henry the Friendly; 1299–1327	Otto; Duke of Austria; 1301–1339	John; Parricida c. 1290–1312/1313
Albertinian line	Leopoldian line
Rudolf IV; Duke of Austria; 1339–1365	Frederick III; 1347–1362	Albert III; Duke of Austria; 1349–1395	Leopold III; Duke of Austria; 1351–1386	Frederick II; Duke of Austria; 1327–1344	Leopold II; Duke of Austria; 1328–1344
Albert IV; Duke of Austria; 1377–1404	William; Duke of Austria c. 1370–1406	Leopold IV; Duke of Austria; 1371–1411	Ernest; Duke of Austria; 1377–1424	Frederick IV; Duke of Austria; 1382–1439
Albert II of Germany; 1397–1439	Frederick III; HRE; 1415–1493	Albert VI; Archduke of Austria; 1418–1463	Sigismund; Archduke of Austria; 1427–1496
Ladislaus the Posthumous; 1440–1457	Maximilian I HRE; 1459–1519
Philip I of Castile; 1478–1506
Spanish / Iberian line	Austrian / HRE line
Charles V HRE; 1500–1558	Ferdinand I HRE; 1503–1564
Philip II of Spain; 1527–1598	Maximilian II; HRE; 1527–1576	Ferdinand II; Archduke of Austria; 1529–1595	Charles II; Archduke of Austria; 1540–1590
Carlos; Prince of Asturias; 1545–1568	Philip III of Spain; 1578–1621	Rudolf II; HRE; 1552–1612	Ernest of Austria; 1553–1595	Matthias; HRE; 1557–1619	Maximilian III; Archduke of Austria; 1558–1618	Albert VII; Archduke of Austria; 1559–1621	Wenceslaus; Archduke of Austria; 1561–1578	Andrew; Margrave of Burgau; 1558–1600	Charles; Margrave of Burgau; 1560–1618	Ferdinand II; HRE; 1578–1637	Maximilian Ernest of Austria; 1583–1616	Leopold V Archduke of Austria; 1586–1632	Charles of Austria; 1590–1624
Philip IV of Spain; 1605–1665	Charles of Austria; 1607–1632	Ferdinand of Austria; 1609–1641	John-Charles of Austria; 1605–1619	Ferdinand III; HRE; 1608–1657	Leopold Wilhelm of Austria; 1614–1662	Ferdinand Charles; Archduke of Austria; 1628–1662	Sigismund Francis; Archduke of Austria; 1630–1665
Balthasar Charles; Prince of Asturias; 1629–1646	Charles II of Spain; 1661–1700	Ferdinand IV; King of the Romans; 1633–1654	Leopold I HRE; 1640–1705	Charles Joseph of Austria; 1649–1664
Joseph I HRE; 1678–1711	Charles VI; HRE; 1685–1740
Lorraine
Maria Theresa; HRE; 1740–1780	Francis I HRE; 1745–1765
Habsburg-Lorraine
Joseph II; HRE; 1765–1790	Leopold II; HRE; 1790–1792
Francis II; HRE; 1792–1806

== See also ==
- Habsburg family tree
