= Gaming Charterhouse =

Former Carthusian monastery in Austria

Coordinates: 47°55′24″N 15°04′54″E

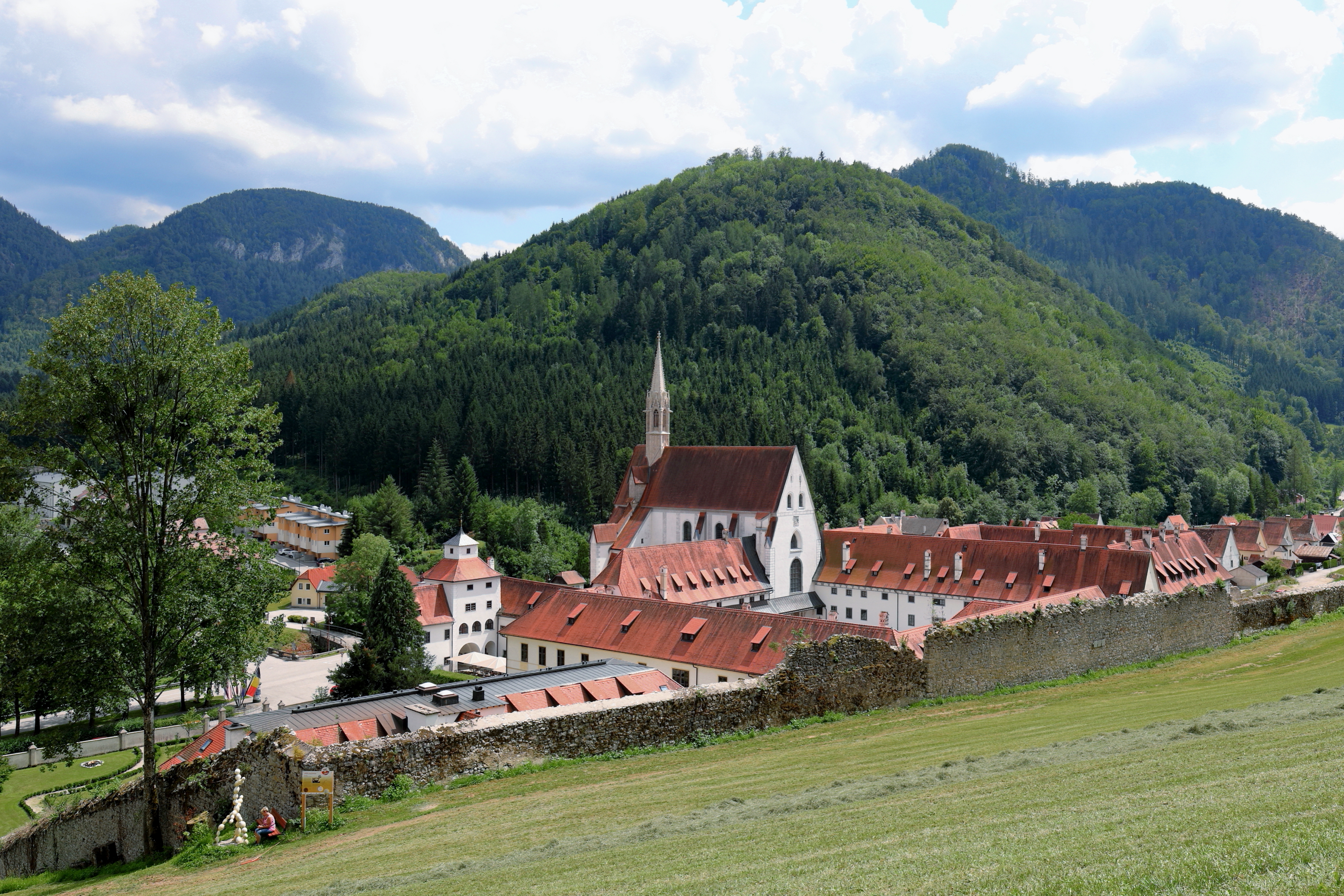
Gaming Charterhouse

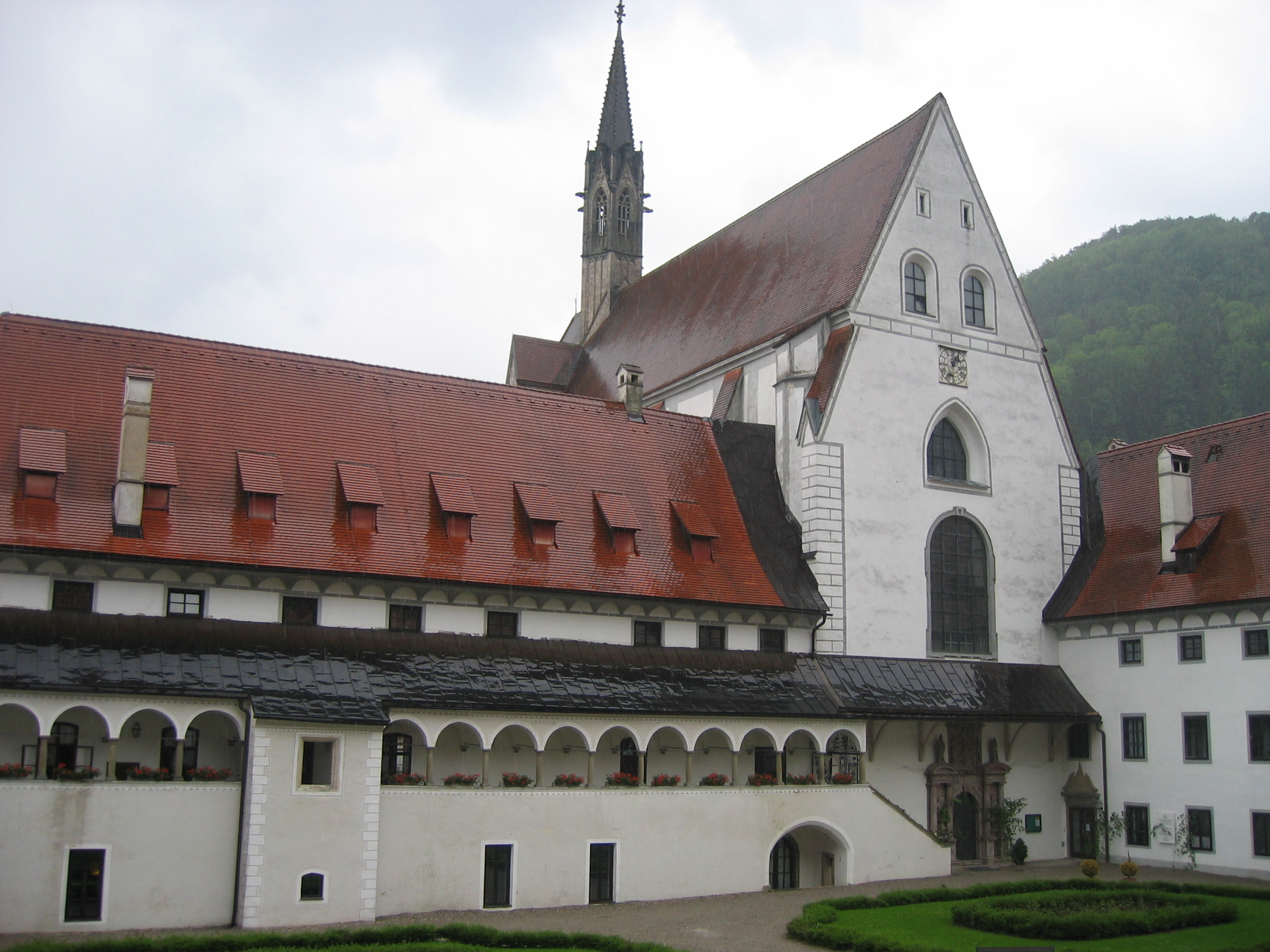
Gaming Charterhouse, courtyard and church façade

Gaming Charterhouse (German: Kartause Gaming, also known as Kartause Maria Thron) is a former Carthusian monastery in Gaming near Scheibbs in the Mostviertel of Lower Austria.

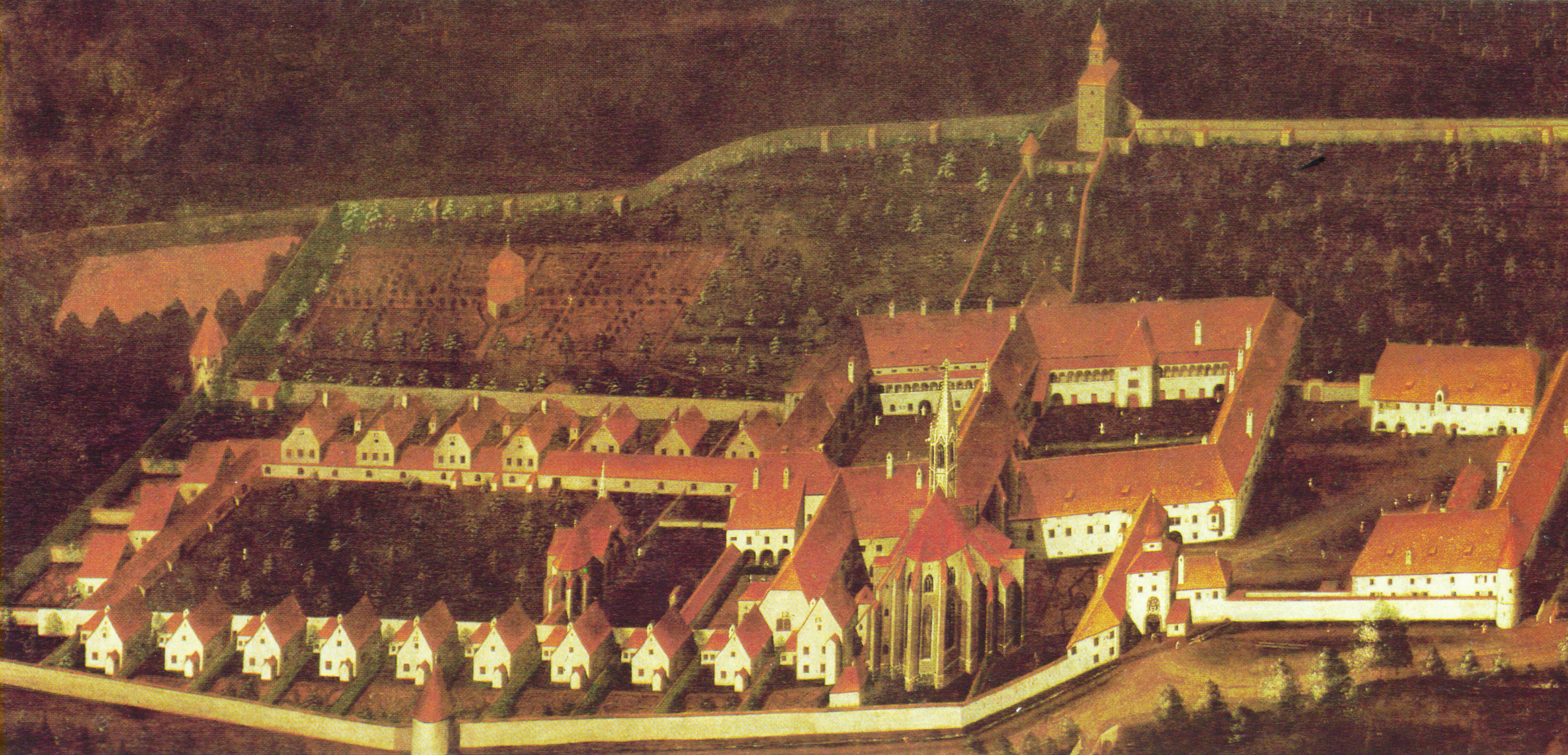
Gaming Charterhouse, original building

The monastery was founded in 1330 by Albert II, Duke of Austria, who intended it as a dynastic burial place. He himself was buried there after his death in 1358, as were his wife Joanna of Pfirt (d. 1351) and his daughter-in-law Elisabeth of Bohemia (d. 1373). The first community, from Mauerbach Charterhouse in Vienna, comprised a double complement, under a prior, of 24 monks rather than the usual 12, and the scale of the buildings from the beginning reflected the monastery's size.

Gaming Charterhouse received extremely generous endowments from its founder, including much surrounding land in the valley of the Erlauf, and the town and market of Scheibbs.

It was dissolved in 1782 in the reforms of Emperor Joseph II. In 1797 the bodies of the founder, his wife and daughter-in-law were removed to the parish church of Gaming, and in 1825 the monastery and estate, including large areas of forest, passed into private ownership. In 1915 it was bought by the abbot of Melk Abbey.

In 1983 the monastery premises, but not the remaining estates, were bought by an Austrian architect, Walter Hildebrand, who has since worked on the restoration. The renovated premises are partly occupied by a hotel and partly by Franciscan University of Steubenville (main campus in Ohio, USA). Since 2004 there has also been a museum, with displays of the history of Gaming Charterhouse and of the Carthusians in general. Recently a Greek Catholic (Byzantine) chapel has been set up here.

== See also ==
- List of Carthusian monasteries

== Sources and external links ==
- Kartause.at: Gaming Charterhouse church, with museum and universities (in German)
- Gaming Charterhouse Hotel website (in German)
- Monasterium.net: Kartause Gaming (in German)
- Gaming Charterhouse: photographs
- The Austria Program at Franciscan University of Steubenville
