= John III, Count of Auxerre =

Jean of Châlon, Count of Auxerre was a French nobleman and soldier who fought in the Hundred Years' War, and was the son of Jean II of Châlon. He was Count of Auxerre from 1361 to 1370.

Although a French encyclopaedia lists him as Grand Butler of France, his father (who was not killed in battle as the article asserts) is also possible since the period of service was from about 1350 until 1361, i.e. the year of his father's death. The article also errs in identifying his mother, who actually was his father's second wife, Alix, daughter of Reginald of Burgundy.

In 1364, the Count fought alongside Bertrand du Guesclin at the battles of Cocherel and the Auray, where he was captured while commanding the left battle.
