= Joanna of Pfirt =

Countess of Pfirt and Duchess of Austria (c. 1300–1351)

- Duchess of Austria; Countess of Pfirt
- Statue at St. Stephen's Cathedral, Vienna (c. 1360)
- Born: c. 1300; Basel
- Died: 15 November 1351 (aged c. 51); Vienna, Austria
- Burial: Gaming Charterhouse
- Spouse: Albert II of Austria (m. 1324)
- Issue among others...: Rudolf IV; Frederick III; Albert III; Leopold III
- Noble family: Scarponnois
- Father: Ulrich III of Pfirt
- Mother: Joanna of Burgundy

Joanna of Pfirt (French: Jeanne de Ferrette; c. 1300 – 15 November 1351) was the Countess of Pfirt in her own right from 1324 and Duchess of Austria as wife of Albert II from 1330 until her death.

== Life ==
=== Early life ===
Born in Basel, Joanna was the eldest daughter of Ulrich III, Count of Pfirt, and his wife, Joanna of Burgundy.

When Reginald of Burgundy, the last Count of Montbéliard from the Chalon-Arlay dynasty, died in 1321, his daughter, Joanna of Montbéliard (Joanna of Pfirt's mother), inherited her father's domains. Joanna and Ulrich III had four daughters and no sons. When Ulrich died in March 1324, he left large estates in Sundgau, located in the southern Vosges Mountains with the strategically important Burgundian Gate, and in the northern Jura foothills. Ulrich's surviving legacy was his two daughters, Joanna of Pfirt and her younger sister Ursula (1315–1367).

Leopold I, Duke of Austria, was head of the Habsburg dynasty since 1308. He concentrated on the administration of the family's Further Austrian territories in Swabia, while his brother Frederick the Fair rivalled with King Louis the Bavarian. When Leopold found out that the late Count of Pfirt's daughter, Joanna was still unmarried, he sent his younger brother Albert II to make the official request to Joanna of Montbéliard for her daughter's hand. With the lands of Pfirt, Joanna was an attractive party. Joanna ceded her domains (including the town of Belfort) to the House of Habsburg, whereby the dynasty could add a large contiguous territory in Southern Alsace to its Swabian possessions. The treaty between Joanna and Leopold was sealed on March 17 at Thann.

=== Marriage ===
Joanna married Albert II in Vienna on 26 March 1324. At first, the marriage was unhappy, and Joanna was considered to be well into child-bearing years. The couple had children early in their marriage, but they were all short-lived (and all were buried in St. Stephen's Cathedral, Vienna). In total, Albert and Joanna had five short-lived children throughout their marriage.

Albert II succeeded as Duke of Austria and Styria upon the death of Frederick the Fair in 1330. However, around same time, he fell ill with polyarthritis which paralyzed his legs, which seemed to preclude producing heirs. For divine aid, the duke went on a pilgrimage to Cologne and Aachen in 1337. Two years later, when Joanna was in her late thirties, she gave birth to a son and continued to have children.

In total Albert and Joanna had six surviving children:

1. Rudolf IV, Duke of Austria (November 1, 1339 – July 27, 1365), died married but childless.
2. Catherine (1342 – 10 January 1381), Abbess of St. Klara in Vienna.
3. Margaret (1346 – 14 January 1366), married:
  1. in Passau 4 September 1359 to Meinhard III of Gorizia-Tyrol;
  2. in Vienna 1364 to John Henry, Margrave of Moravia.
4. Frederick III, Duke of Austria (1347 – 1362), died unmarried.
5. Albert III, Duke of Austria (September 9, 1349 – August 29, 1395), had issue.
6. Leopold III (November 1, 1351 – July 9, 1386), had issue.

Joanna was described as wise and prudent and was said to be politically talented and smart. In 1336, Joanna mediated the peace between the Habsburg family and the rising House of Luxembourg over the heritage of the late Henry of Carinthia. The Habsburgs later gained further possessions up to the Adriatic coast, formerly held by the Patriarchs of Aquileia. Through Joanna, Albert and the Habsburgs gained more lands since she was an heiress. Even though there was peace, wars could break out if it promised benefits for Albert and the Habsburgs, who were growing to be one of the most powerful royal families in Europe. After Albert purchased the Duchy of Carinthia with the Carniolan and Windic marches, he did not need allies anymore.

Joanna had children unusually late. When she was fifty-one, she gave birth to her final child, a son, Leopold III, Duke of Austria, and died soon after. She is buried in the Gaming Charterhouse with her husband and daughter-in-law, Elisabeth of Bohemia.
