= Alphabetum Kaldeorum =

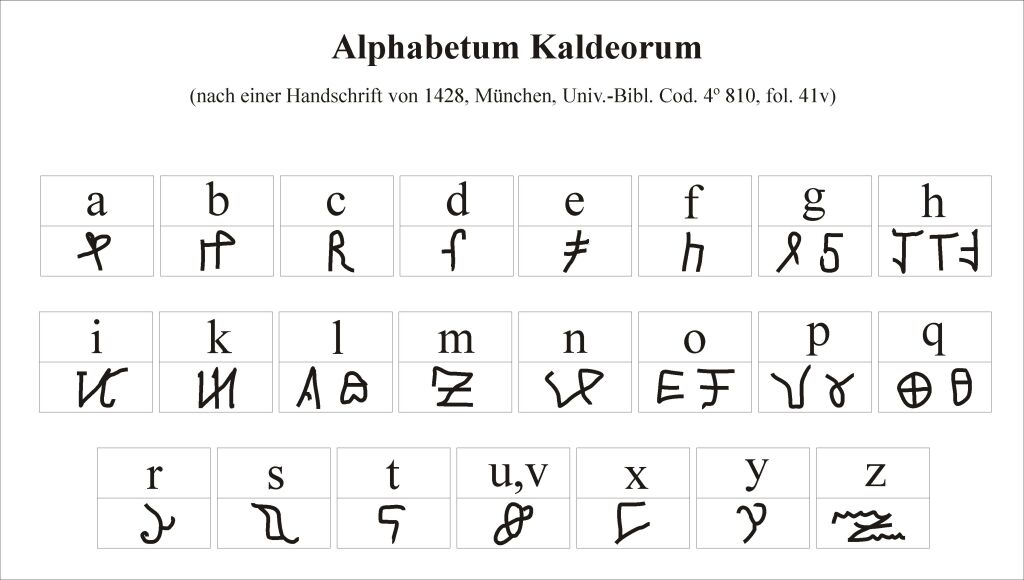
The Alphabetum Kaldeorum

The Alphabetum Kaldeorum ("alphabet of the Chaldeans") is one of the best known ciphers of the Middle Ages. Its name refers to Chaldea, whose inhabitants during the medieval era were reputed to have mysterious and magical knowledge.

It can be found in a complete version, together with other non-Latin alphabets, in a manuscript from the year 1428, now in the library at LMU Munich (Cod. 4º 810, fol. 41v). However, its origins lie clearly in an earlier time, as some examples of its practical use demonstrate.

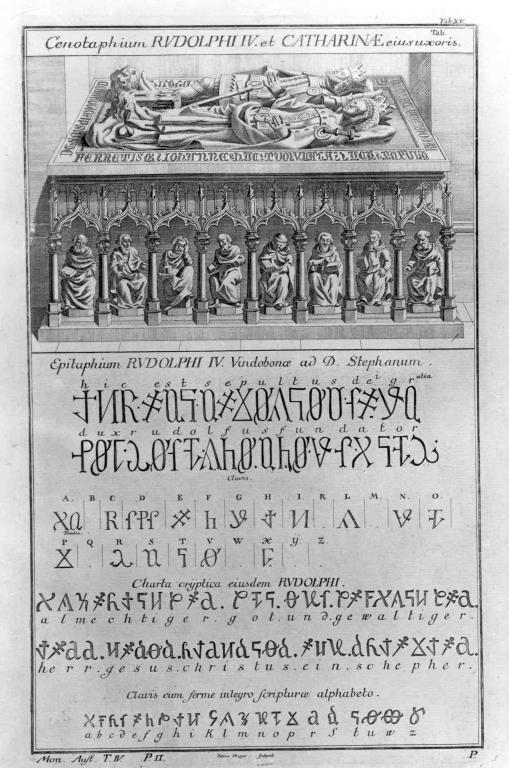
The decipherment of the epitaph accompanying the cenotaph, or symbolic tomb, of Duke Rudolph IV in the Stephansdom in Vienna.

The Alphabetum Kaldeorum was meant primarily for the encipherment of diplomatic correspondence; its alphabet implies that predominantly Latin texts were coded: u and v are equated; w was to be written as double v; j is missing. For frequently arising letters the Alphabetum Kaldeorum provides several different versions, which were used at random so that a decipherment attempt using the classical frequency analysis method should fail. "Nulla", cipher-letters with no plaintext assignment which were to be ignored, were also often added to the enciphered texts to further render frequency-analysis useless.

A possible author of the Alphabetum Kaldeorum is Duke Rudolf IV of Austria (1339–1365), who attributed an Indian origin to them; the letters of the Alphabetum Kaldeorum are probably not, however, at all related to any writing common in India, and are actually independent creations.

Even Rudolf's gravestone in the Stephansdom in Vienna carries an inscription enciphered using the Alphabetum Kaldeorum, which gives the names and titles of the duke.
