= Reginald of Burgundy =

- Count of Montbéliard, jure uxoris
- Died: 1321
- Noble family: House of Ivrea
- Spouse: Guillemette of Neufchâtel
- Issue: Othenin, Count of Montbéliard; Joanna of Burgundy
- Father: Hugh III, Count of Burgundy
- Mother: Adelaide, Countess Palatine of Burgundy

Reginald of Burgundy (in French, Renaud, died 1321) was Count of Montbéliard, jure uxoris, from 1282 to 1321. He was a son of Hugh of Chalon (from the House of Ivrée), sire of Salins, and his wife Adelaide.

After Reginald's death in 1322, his daughter Joanna inherited his lands, due to the insanity of her elder brother.

In 1282, Reginald married Guillemette de Neufchâtel (1260-1317, heiress of the counties of Montbéliard and Belfort by her great-grandfather Thierry III de Montbéliard 1205-1283), with whom he had a son and four daughters:

- Othenin de Montbéliard (Othenin the Mad, d. 1339) – count of Montbéliard under the guardianship of his uncle due to his mental handicap.
- Agnès de Montbéliard (d. 1367) – married Henri de Montfaucon; they received the county of Montbéliard on the death of her elder brother.
- Jeanne de Bourgogne (d. 1349) – married thrice: (1) Ulrich III, Count of Ferrette (d. 1324), and had four daughters of whom two survived, Joanna of Pfirt (wife of Albert II, Duke of Austria) and Ursula; (2) Rodolphe-Hesso of Zähringen, Margrave of Baden-Baden, and had two daughters, Margaret and Adelaide; then (3) count Guillaume II of Katzenelnbogen.
- Marguerite de Montbéliard – married Guillaume II d'Antigny, lord of the Château de Sainte-Croix (fr).
- Alix de Montbéliard, Lady of Montaigu (Jura), Lons (in part), and Montfleur – married her cousin Count Jean II of Chalon-Auxerre (d. 1363); their descendants succeeded as Lords of Montaigu (Jura); their son Jean III was the ancestor of the Counts of Auxerre and Counts of Tonnerre.

== Sources ==
- (in French) Le Roman d'une Principauté, D. Seigneur. - Éditions : Cêtre (Besançon).
