= Guillemette of Neufchâtel =

Guillemette of Neuchâtel
- Countess of Montbéliard, suo jure
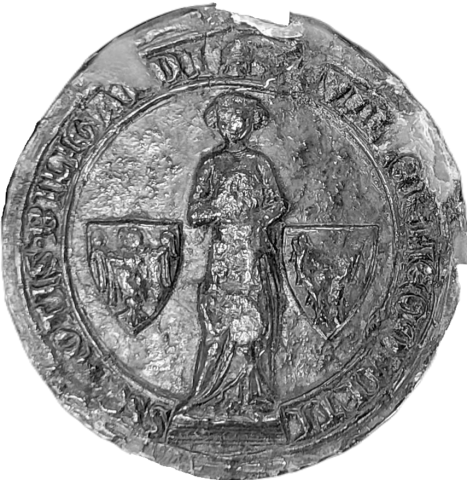
- Born: 1260
- Died: 1317 (aged 56–57); Étobon Castle, near Héricourt, Haute-Saône
- Noble family: House of Montfaucon
- Spouse: Reginald of Burgundy
- Issue: Othenin, Count of Montbéliard; Joanna of Burgundy
- Father: Amadeus, Count of Neuchâtel
- Mother: Jordanna of Arberg

Guillemette de Neufchâtel (1260–1317) was a vassal in the Holy Roman Empire. She was Countess of Montbéliard between 1282 and 1317.

She was the daughter of Amadeus, Count of Neufchâtel and his wife, Jordanna of Arberg. In 1259, her great-aunt Margaret, married Richard of Neufchâtel-en-Bourgogne. As her dowry, she brought the Lordships of Blamont, Châtelot, Belmont, and Cuisance into the marriage. The Lords of Neufchâtel-en-Bourgogne placed Blamont under the protection of the Duke of Burgundy and thus detached it from Montbéliard.

In 1282, Guillemette married Reginald of Burgundy. They had five children:

- Othenin "the Mad" (d. 1339), who succeeded her as Count of Montbéliard
- Agnes of Montbéliard (d. 1377), married Henry I, Count of Montbéliard, who inherited Montbéliard after Othenin's death
- Joanna (d. 1347), married:
  1. Ulrich III, Count of Pfirt
  2. Rudolf Hesso, Margrave of Baden-Baden
  3. William, Count of Katzenelnbogen
- Margaret, married William of Antigny, Prince of Sainte-Croix
- Adelaide, married John II, Count of Chalon-Auxerre

In 1283, her great-grandfather, Theodoric III, Count of Montbéliard (1205–1283) died. He had outlived all his children and in his will, he left the County of Montbéliard to his great-granddaughter Guillemette. Theobald III of Neufchâtel, who was a grandchild of Theodoric III and who wanted Montbéliard for himself, conspired with Reginald's brother Otto IV to have Montbéliard recognized as a fief of Burgundy. To resolve this, Reginald ceded Blamont and Châtelot to Theobald.

Guillemette of Neufchâtel House of Neufchâtel Born: 1260 Died: 1317
Preceded by Theodoric III	Countess suo jure of Montbéliard; 1282-1317; With: Reginald of Burgundy (jure uxoris)	Succeeded by Reginald of Burgundy
