= Henry I of Montbéliard =

Henry I of Montfaucon (before 1318–1367) was Lord of Montfaucon, who became Count of Montbéliard through his marriage to Agnes, the daughter of Reginald of Burgundy, Count of Montbéliard. He ruled after the death of his brother-in-law Othenin the Mad, who was mentally handicapped and whose uncle, Hugh of Chalon, brother of Reginald of Burgundy, provided both the regency council and guardianship of his nephew.

In June 1332, he entered into a treaty with the Marquis of Baden involving the fief of Ferrette.

In March 1340, he faced a revolt of the people of Montbéliard. The revolt was serious, but instead of bloodshed, he managed to calm the insurgency with soothing words and promises of forgiveness.

Like most of his predecessors, he participated in many battles. He joined the King of France, Philip VI the Fortunate in the war against the Flemings at the Battle of Mont Cassel in 1328. Later, he fought with the French against the English, and Prussia, with the Teutonic Knights, against the Lithuanians.

With Agnes, he had a son, Stephen of Montfaucon, who succeeded him.

| Preceded by Othenin of Montbéliard | Count of Montbéliard; 1332–1367 | Succeeded by Stephen of Montfaucon |
