= Rudolf IV of Austria =

Duke of Austria from 1358 to 1365

Rudolf IV
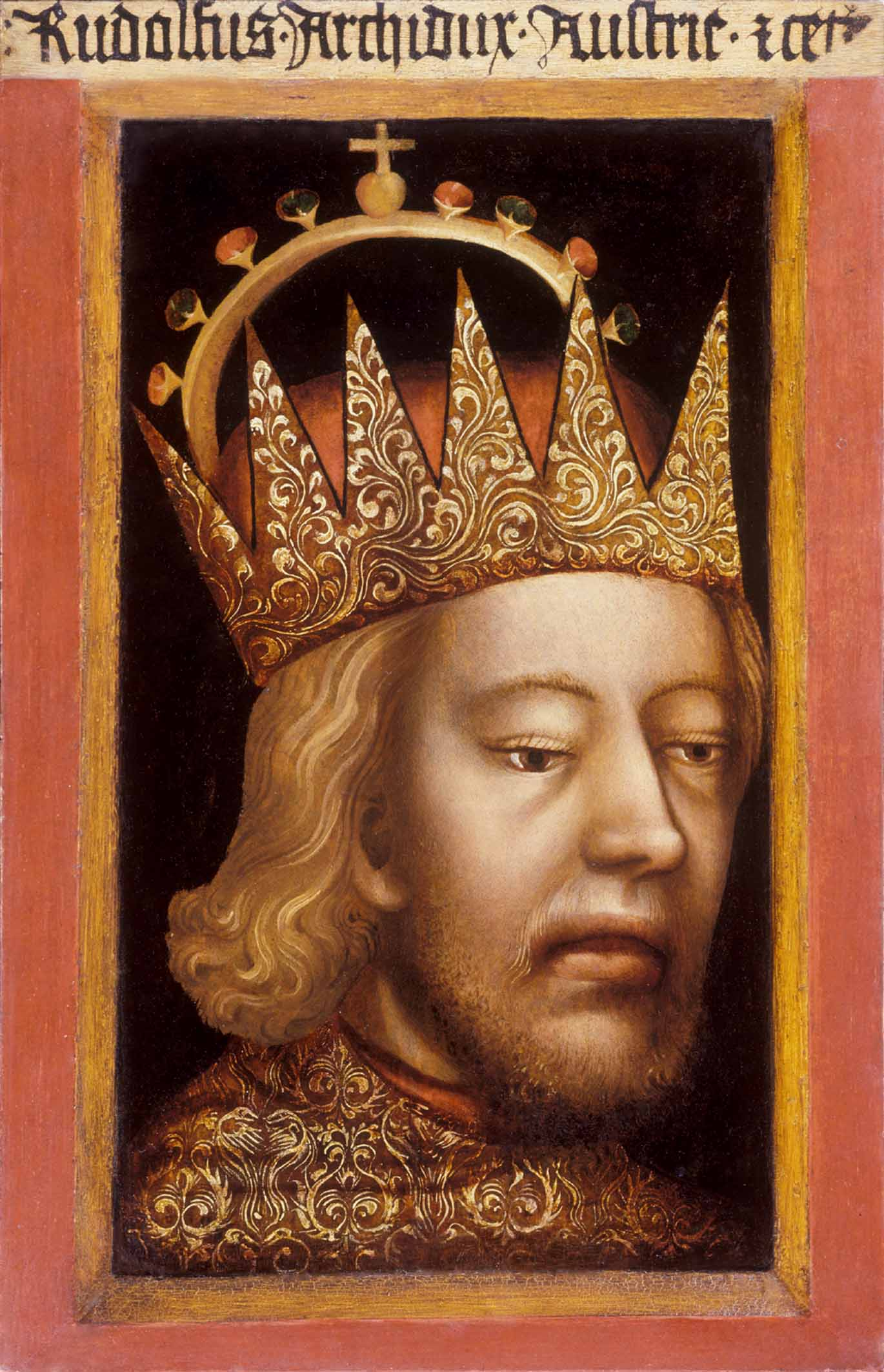
- Portrait in the museum of St. Stephen's Cathedral, Vienna, c. 1360-1365

Duke of Austria
- Reign: 1358–1365
- Predecessor: Albert II
- Successor: Albert III & Leopold III
- Born: 1 November 1339; Vienna
- Died: 27 July 1365 (aged 25); Milan
- Burial: Ducal Crypt, Vienna
- Spouse: Catherine of Luxembourg
- House: House of Habsburg
- Father: Albert II, Duke of Austria
- Mother: Joanna of Pfirt

Rudolf IV (1 November 1339 – 27 July 1365), also called Rudolf the Founder (German: der Stifter), was a scion of the House of Habsburg who ruled as duke of Austria (self-proclaimed archduke), Styria and Carinthia from 1358, as well as count of Tyrol from 1363 and as the first duke of Carniola from 1364 until his death. He succeeded his father Albert II, Duke of Austria (d. 1358), who was not included among the seven imperial prince-electors by the Golden Bull of 1356. In order to acquire titles and honors higher than ducal, Rudolf commissioned the "Privilegium Maius", a forged document accompanied by several other forgeries, that were divised in order to elevate Austrian dukes to various titles, rights and privileges. The Emperor Charles IV refused to recognize and confirm the validity of those claims, but in spite of that, Rudolf started to use the archducal title by the middle of 1359, and continued to assert those claims until his death.

== Early life ==
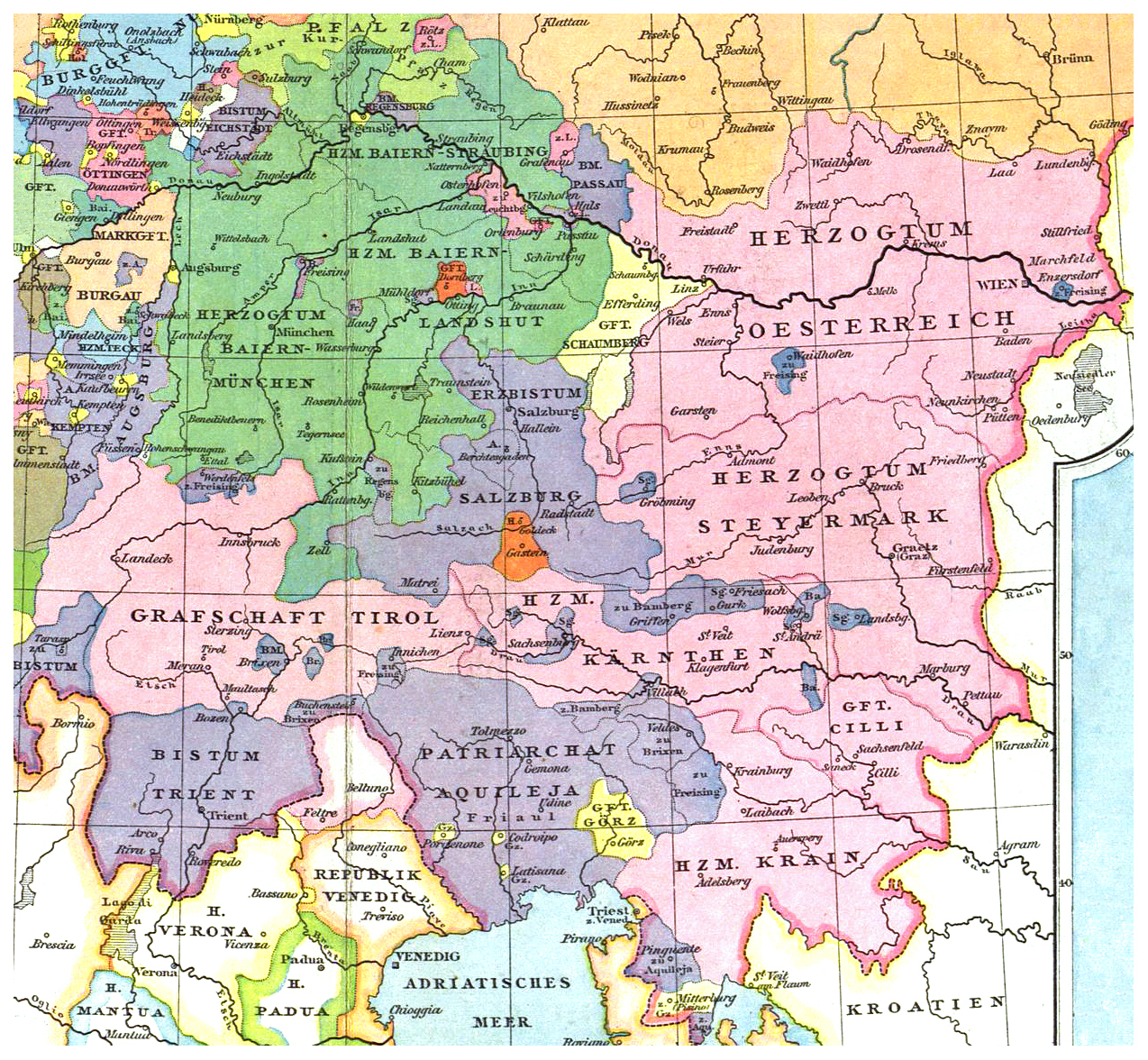
Habsburg domains in Austria, Styria, Carinthia, Carniola, Tyrol and the surrounding regions circa 1350

Born in Vienna, Rudolf was the eldest son of Duke Albert II of Austria and Joanna of Pfirt. One of the third generation of Habsburg dukes in Austria, he was the first to be born within the duchy. Therefore, he considered Austria his home, a sentiment that no doubt communicated itself to his subjects and contributed to his popularity. Faced with the Habsburgs' loss of the Imperial crown upon the assassination of his grandfather King Albert I of Germany in 1308, Rudolf was one of the most energetic and active rulers of Austria in the late Middle Ages, and it was said of him that as a young man he already had the air of a king.

== Rule ==
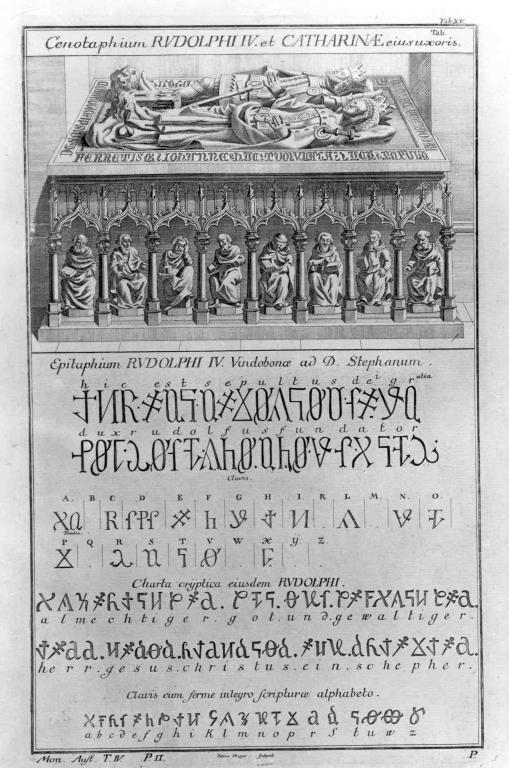
The decipherment of the epitaph accompanying the cenotaph, or symbolic tomb, of Duke Rudolph IV in the Stephansdom in Vienna. The translation of the secret writing into English is "This is the sepulchre of Rudolph, by the Grace of God, Duke and Founder" and "Almighty God and great lord Jesus Christ, a shepherd." Rudolf was, in fact, never buried within the almost-solid stone structure, but in the Ducal Crypt of the Stephansdom in Vienna. The text is written using the Alphabetum Kaldeorum, a code he probably invented.

In 1357 he was married to Catherine of Bohemia, daughter of Emperor Charles IV. Eager to compete with his mighty father-in-law, who had made the Kingdom of Bohemia and its capital Prague a radiant center of Imperial culture, Rudolf desired to raise the importance of his residence Vienna to a comparable or greater height. For more than a century, the Habsburg dukes had chafed at the popes' failure to make Vienna the seat of its own diocese, a status that they considered appropriate for the capital of a duchy. Instead the city parish was subordinate to the bishops of Passau, who had excellent connections to the pope, apparently dooming Vienna's prospects in this regard. Rudolf, however, resorted to something which could be considered imposture: He initiated the creation of a "metropolitan cathedral chapter" at the church of St. Stephen (which, according to the name, should be assigned to a bishop), whose members wore red garments as cardinals do. The provost of the chapter received the title of an "archchancellor of Austria".

Rudolf extended St. Stephen's Cathedral, with the construction of its gothic nave being started under Rudolf's rule. The construction efforts can be seen as an attempt to compete with St. Vitus Cathedral in Prague. Rudolf had himself and his wife depicted on a cenotaph at the cathedral's entrance.

Similarly, by founding the University of Vienna in 1365, Rudolf sought to match Charles IV's founding of the Charles University of Prague in 1348. Still known as Alma Mater Rudolphina today, the University of Vienna is the oldest continuously operating university in the German-speaking world. However, a faculty of theology, which was considered crucial for a university at that time, was not established until 1385, twenty years after Rudolf's death.

To improve the economy of Vienna, Rudolf introduced many other measures, including the supervision by the mayor of sales of real property, instituted to prevent sales to the dead hand, i.e., to prevent economically unproductive ownership by the Church. Rudolf also managed to establish a relatively stable currency, the so-called Wiener Pfennig (Vienna Penny).

Rudolf is best known for another bluff, the forgery of the Privilegium Maius, which de facto put him on par with the seven Prince-electors of the Holy Roman Empire, compensating for Austria's failure to receive an electoral vote in the Golden Bull of 1356 issued by Emperor Charles IV. The title of Archduke (Erzherzog), invented by Rudolf, became an honorific title of all males of the House of Habsburg from the 16th century.

In 1363, Rudolf entered into a contract of inheritance with Countess Margaret of Gorizia-Tyrol upon the death of her only son, Meinhard III. The County of Tyrol came under Austrian rule after her death in 1369 since Margraret's brother-in-law Duke Stephen II of Bavaria had invaded the country. In 1364, Rudolf declared the Carinthian March of Carniola a duchy and the next year established the town of Novo Mesto in the Windic March (in what would later be known as Lower Carniola, in present-day Slovenia), whose German name Rudolfswert was given in his honor. In the same time, he concluded another contract of inheritance with his father-in-law Emperor Charles IV, providing for mutual inheritance between the Habsburg and Luxembourg dynasties.

== Death ==
In spite of the high-flying and sometimes megalomaniac character of his plans, he managed to modernize his territories and his city, the prominence of which considerably increased. Rudolf died suddenly at Milan in 1365 aged 25. His and his wife's remains are buried at the Ducal Crypt underneath the Stephansdom in Vienna.

His untimely death without issue halted further progress, however. His younger brothers Albert III and Leopold III, who were to rule jointly under the Rudolfinische Hausordnung (Rudolfinian House Rules), began to quarrel ceaselessly and ultimately agreed to divide the Habsburg territories between them according to the 1379 Treaty of Neuberg. It was Leopold's descendant Frederick V of Austria, elected King of the Romans in 1440 and sole ruler over all Austrian lands from 1457, who reaped the fruit of Rudolf's efforts and laid the foundations of the Habsburg monarchy.

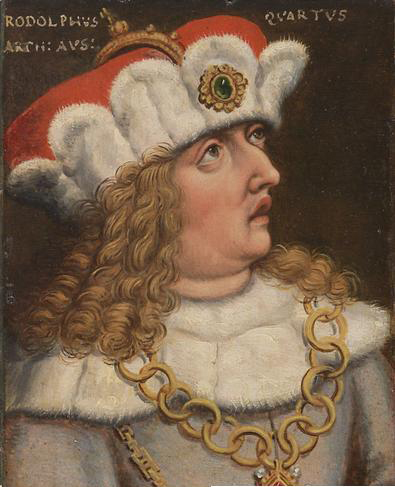
Duke Rudolph IV of Austria

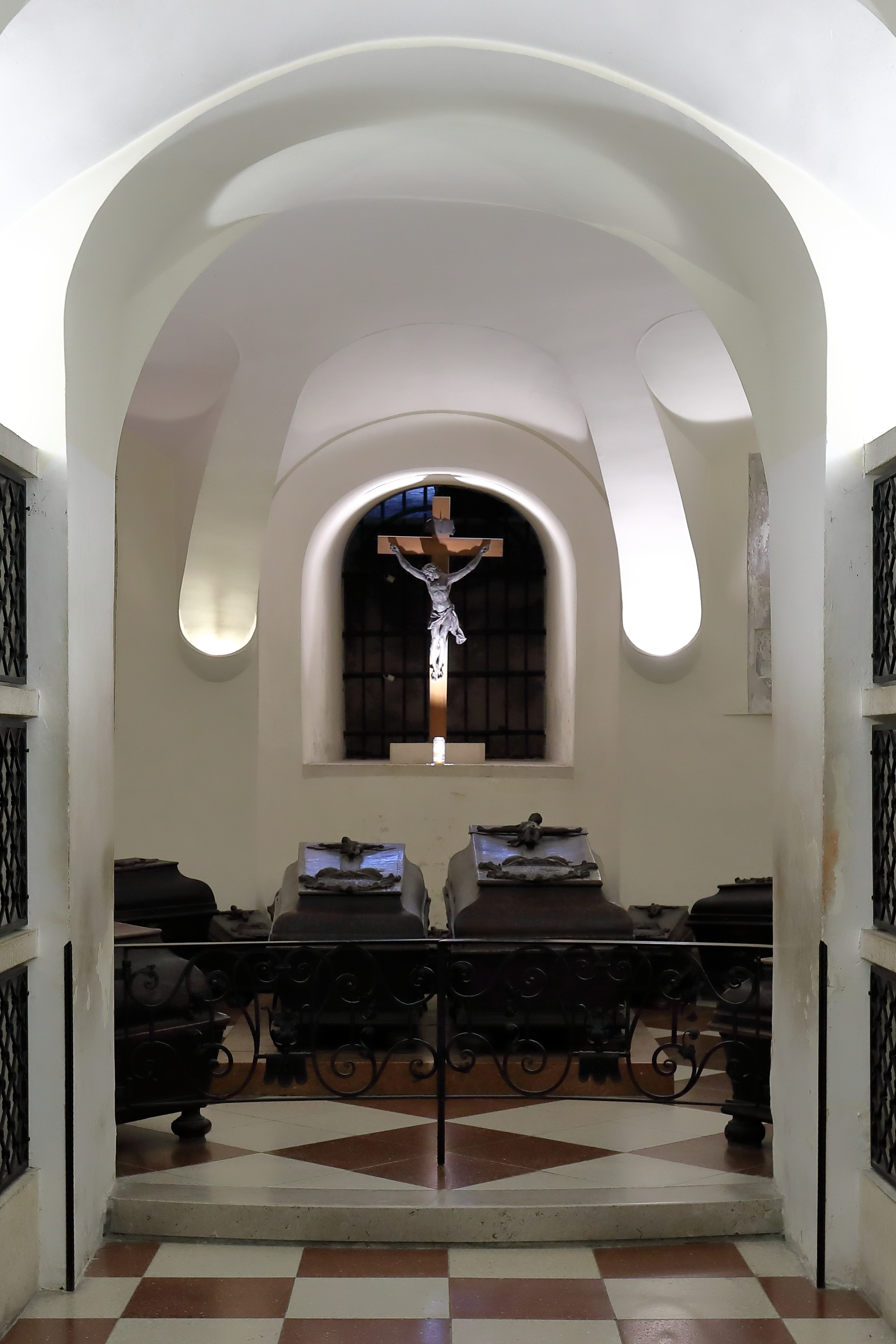
Coffin of Rudolf and his wife in the Ducal Crypt, Vienna

== Male-line family tree ==
House of Habsburg

Original line
Albert; Count of Habsburg c. 1188–1239
Rudolf I of Germany c. 1218–1291
Albert I of Germany; 1255–1308 | Hartmann; 1263–1281 | Rudolf II; Duke of Austria; 1270–1290
Rudolf I of Bohemia; 1281–1307 | Frederick the Fair c. 1289–1330 | Leopold I Duke of Austria; 1290–1326 | Albert II; Duke of Austria; 1298–1358 | Henry the Friendly; 1299–1327 | Otto; Duke of Austria; 1301–1339 | John; Parricida c. 1290–1312/1313
Albertinian line | Leopoldian line
Rudolf IV; Duke of Austria; 1339–1365 | Frederick III; 1347–1362 | Albert III; Duke of Austria; 1349–1395 | Leopold III; Duke of Austria; 1351–1386 | Frederick II; Duke of Austria; 1327–1344 | Leopold II; Duke of Austria; 1328–1344
Albert IV; Duke of Austria; 1377–1404 | William; Duke of Austria c. 1370–1406 | Leopold IV; Duke of Austria; 1371–1411 | Ernest; Duke of Austria; 1377–1424 | Frederick IV; Duke of Austria; 1382–1439
Albert II of Germany; 1397–1439 | Frederick III; HRE; 1415–1493 | Albert VI; Archduke of Austria; 1418–1463 | Sigismund; Archduke of Austria; 1427–1496
Ladislaus the Posthumous; 1440–1457 | Maximilian I HRE; 1459–1519
Philip I of Castile; 1478–1506
Spanish / Iberian line | Austrian / HRE line
Charles V HRE; 1500–1558 | Ferdinand I HRE; 1503–1564
Philip II of Spain; 1527–1598 | Maximilian II; HRE; 1527–1576 | Ferdinand II; Archduke of Austria; 1529–1595 | Charles II; Archduke of Austria; 1540–1590
Carlos; Prince of Asturias; 1545–1568 | Philip III of Spain; 1578–1621 | Rudolf II; HRE; 1552–1612 | Ernest of Austria; 1553–1595 | Matthias; HRE; 1557–1619 | Maximilian III; Archduke of Austria; 1558–1618 | Albert VII; Archduke of Austria; 1559–1621 | Wenceslaus; Archduke of Austria; 1561–1578 | Andrew; Margrave of Burgau; 1558–1600 | Charles; Margrave of Burgau; 1560–1618 | Ferdinand II; HRE; 1578–1637 | Maximilian Ernest of Austria; 1583–1616 | Leopold V Archduke of Austria; 1586–1632 | Charles of Austria; 1590–1624
Philip IV of Spain; 1605–1665 | Charles of Austria; 1607–1632 | Ferdinand of Austria; 1609–1641 | John-Charles of Austria; 1605–1619 | Ferdinand III; HRE; 1608–1657 | Leopold Wilhelm of Austria; 1614–1662 | Ferdinand Charles; Archduke of Austria; 1628–1662 | Sigismund Francis; Archduke of Austria; 1630–1665
Balthasar Charles; Prince of Asturias; 1629–1646 | Charles II of Spain; 1661–1700 | Ferdinand IV; King of the Romans; 1633–1654 | Leopold I HRE; 1640–1705 | Charles Joseph of Austria; 1649–1664
Joseph I HRE; 1678–1711 | Charles VI; HRE; 1685–1740
Lorraine
Maria Theresa; HRE; 1740–1780 | Francis I HRE; 1745–1765
Habsburg-Lorraine
Joseph II; HRE; 1765–1790 | Leopold II; HRE; 1790–1792
Francis II; HRE; 1792–1806

== Sources ==
- Appelt, Heinrich (1977). "Die Bedeutung des Titels archidux palatinus Austriae". Festschrift Friedrich Hausmann. Graz: Akademische Druck- und Verlagsanstalt. pp. 15–20.
- Lhotsky, Alphons (1957). Privilegium maius: Die Geschichte einer Urkunde. Wien: Verlag für Geschichte und Politik.
- Sauter, Alexander (2003). Fürstliche Herrschaftsrepräsentation: Die Habsburger im 14. Jahrhundert. Ostfildern: Jan Thorbecke Verlag.
- Wilson, Peter H. (2016). Heart of Europe: A History of the Holy Roman Empire. Cambridge: Harvard University Press.

Regnal titles
| Preceded by Albert II | Margrave of Carniola; 1358–1364 | Elevated to duchy |
| Preceded by Albert II | Duke of Austria, Styria and Carinthia; 1358–1365 | Succeeded by Albert III; Leopold III |
| Preceded by Meinhard III | Count of Tyrol; 1363–1365 | Succeeded by Albert III; Leopold III |
| New title | Duke of Carniola; 1364–1365 | Succeeded by Albert III; Leopold III |
