= Albert II of Austria =

Duke of Austria and Styria (1298-1358)

Albert II
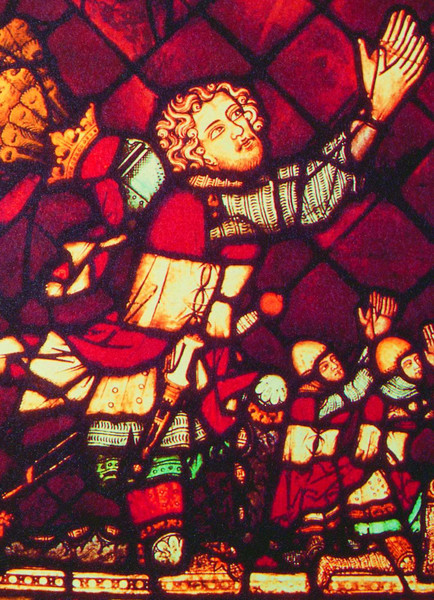
- Stained glass depiction, c. 14th century

Duke of Austria and Styria
- Reign: 13 January 1330 – 16 August 1358
- Predecessor: Frederick I
- Successor: Rudolf IV

Duke of Carinthia
- Reign: 2 April 1335 – 16 August 1358
- Predecessor: Henry of Bohemia
- Successor: Rudolf II
- Born: 12 December 1298; Habsburg Castle, Swabia
- Died: 16 August 1358 (aged 59); Vienna, Austria
- Spouse: Johanna of Pfirt
- Issue: Rudolf IV, Duke of Austria; Catherine; Margaret; Frederick III of Austria; Albert III, Duke of Austria; Leopold III, Duke of Austria
- House: House of Habsburg
- Father: Albert I of Germany
- Mother: Elisabeth of Carinthia, Queen of Germany

Albert II (German: Albrecht II. von Österreich; 12 December 1298 – 16 August 1358), known as the Wise (der Weise) or the Lame (der Lahme), a member of the House of Habsburg, was duke of Austria and Styria from 1330, as well as duke of Carinthia and margrave of Carniola from 1335 until his death.

== Biography ==
Albert II was born at Habsburg Castle in Swabia, a younger son of King Albert I of Germany and his wife Elisabeth of Carinthia, Queen of Germany, a member of the House of Gorizia (Meinhardiner). He initially prepared for an ecclesiastical career and, though still a minor, was elected Bishop of Passau in 1313. However, he had to rival with an opposing candidate and finally renounced the office in 1317.

After the death of their elder brother Frederick the Fair in 1330, the surviving sons Albert II and Otto, Duke of Austria became joint rulers of all Habsburg dominions in Austria and Styria. Albert was able to further increase his possessions by the inheritance of his wife Joanna of Pfirt, which was made up of the Alsatian county of Pfirt and several cities. Furthermore, upon the death of his maternal uncle Duke Henry of Carinthia in 1335, Albert succeeded in establishing his claims on the Duchy of Carinthia and the March of Carniola, when he reached his enfeoffment by Emperor Louis IV against the claims raised by his mighty Luxembourg rival King John of Bohemia.

Reflecting his high reputation among the secular and church leaders of Europe, in 1335, Pope Benedict XII asked him to mediate in the church's conflict with Emperor Louis. Two years later, King Philip VI of France 1337 asked him for help against the Wittelsbach emperor and King Edward III of England. Nevertheless, Albert remained faithful to the emperor until Louis' death in 1347; he was also a close ally of his son, Duke Louis V of Bavaria. After the demolition of Rapperswil Castle by the forces of Rudolf Brun in 1350, the Austrian duke marched against the Swiss Confederacy and laid siege to the city of Zürich, though to no avail.

In Austria, Duke Albert had the construction of the Gothic Choir begun in St. Stephen's Cathedral in Vienna, known as the Albertinian Choir. He established the "Albertinian House Rule" (Albertinische Hausordnung) to predetermine the rules of succession in the Habsburg lands according to the principle of primogeniture. Although the rule was disregarded after his death, it was re-assumed under Emperor Maximilian. Adopted as part of the Pragmatic Sanction in 1713, the Albertinian House Rule effectively remained one of the basic laws of Austria until 1918. Styria owes its (former) constitution, the so-called "Mountain Book" (Bergbüchel); the same is true for Carinthia.

It has been speculated that Albert had experienced temporal paralysis (explaining his nickname "Albert the Lame") caused by polyarthritis. If so, however, it did not prevent him from fathering numerous children, of whom six survived childhood.

Albert died at Vienna in 1358 and was buried in a monastery of his own foundation, Gaming Charterhouse in present-day Lower Austria. In 1782, the Gaming Charterhouse was secularised by Joseph II, Holy Roman Emperor; at that time, Albert's remains were transferred to the local parish church. In April 1985 they were returned to the Gaming Charterhouse in a ceremony attended by Regina von Habsburg, wife of the Head of the House of Habsburg, Otto von Habsburg, as well as her son Karl von Habsburg.

According to his House Rule, Albert was succeeded by his eldest son Rudolf IV, whose younger brothers acted as regents. However, after Rudolf's death in 1365, the Habsburg lands were divided among Albert's younger sons Albert III and Leopold III by the 1379 Treaty of Neuberg.

== Family and children ==
On 15 February 1324, Albert married Countess Johanna of Pfirt, daughter of Count Ulrich III of Pfirt, in Vienna. The couple had the following children:

1. Rudolf IV, Duke of Austria (1 November 1339, Vienna – 27 July 1365, Milan), who succeeded his father as Duke of Austria, Styria and Carinthia. His marriage with Catherine of Luxembourg remained childless; upon his death, he was succeeded by his younger brothers Albert III and Leopold III;
2. Catherine (1342, Vienna – 10 January 1381, Vienna), Abbess of St. Klara in Vienna;
3. Margaret (1346, Vienna – 14 January 1366, Brno), married:
  1. in Passau 4 September 1359 Count Meinhard III of Gorizia-Tyrol;
  2. in Vienna 1364 Margrave John Henry of Moravia.
4. Frederick III of Austria (1347, Vienna – 1362, Vienna). Died unmarried;
5. Albert III, Duke of Austria (9 September 1349, Vienna – 29 August 1395, Castle Laxenburg). His first marriage with Elisabeth of Bohemia, a daughter of the Luxembourg emperor Charles IV remained childless; he married, secondly, Beatrix of Nuremberg, a daughter of the Hohenzollern burgrave Frederick V. Progenitor of the Habsburg Albertinian line;
6. Leopold III, Duke of Austria (1 November 1351, Vienna – 9 July 1386, Sempach). Married to Viridis Visconti, second daughter of Barnabò Visconti, Lord of Milan; progenitor of the Habsburg Leopoldian line.

== Male-line family tree ==
House of Habsburg

Original line
Albert; Count of Habsburg c. 1188–1239
Rudolf I of Germany c. 1218–1291
Albert I of Germany; 1255–1308	Hartmann; 1263–1281	Rudolf II; Duke of Austria; 1270–1290
Rudolf I of Bohemia; 1281–1307	Frederick the Fair c. 1289–1330	Leopold I Duke of Austria; 1290–1326	Albert II; Duke of Austria; 1298–1358	Henry the Friendly; 1299–1327	Otto; Duke of Austria; 1301–1339	John; Parricida c. 1290–1312/1313
Albertinian line	Leopoldian line
Rudolf IV; Duke of Austria; 1339–1365	Frederick III; 1347–1362	Albert III; Duke of Austria; 1349–1395	Leopold III; Duke of Austria; 1351–1386	Frederick II; Duke of Austria; 1327–1344	Leopold II; Duke of Austria; 1328–1344
Albert IV; Duke of Austria; 1377–1404	William; Duke of Austria c. 1370–1406	Leopold IV; Duke of Austria; 1371–1411	Ernest; Duke of Austria; 1377–1424	Frederick IV; Duke of Austria; 1382–1439
Albert II of Germany; 1397–1439	Frederick III; HRE; 1415–1493	Albert VI; Archduke of Austria; 1418–1463	Sigismund; Archduke of Austria; 1427–1496
Ladislaus the Posthumous; 1440–1457	Maximilian I HRE; 1459–1519
Philip I of Castile; 1478–1506
Spanish / Iberian line	Austrian / HRE line
Charles V HRE; 1500–1558	Ferdinand I HRE; 1503–1564
Philip II of Spain; 1527–1598	Maximilian II; HRE; 1527–1576	Ferdinand II; Archduke of Austria; 1529–1595	Charles II; Archduke of Austria; 1540–1590
Carlos; Prince of Asturias; 1545–1568	Philip III of Spain; 1578–1621	Rudolf II; HRE; 1552–1612	Ernest of Austria; 1553–1595	Matthias; HRE; 1557–1619	Maximilian III; Archduke of Austria; 1558–1618	Albert VII; Archduke of Austria; 1559–1621	Wenceslaus; Archduke of Austria; 1561–1578	Andrew; Margrave of Burgau; 1558–1600	Charles; Margrave of Burgau; 1560–1618	Ferdinand II; HRE; 1578–1637	Maximilian Ernest of Austria; 1583–1616	Leopold V Archduke of Austria; 1586–1632	Charles of Austria; 1590–1624
Philip IV of Spain; 1605–1665	Charles of Austria; 1607–1632	Ferdinand of Austria; 1609–1641	John-Charles of Austria; 1605–1619	Ferdinand III; HRE; 1608–1657	Leopold Wilhelm of Austria; 1614–1662	Ferdinand Charles; Archduke of Austria; 1628–1662	Sigismund Francis; Archduke of Austria; 1630–1665
Balthasar Charles; Prince of Asturias; 1629–1646	Charles II of Spain; 1661–1700	Ferdinand IV; King of the Romans; 1633–1654	Leopold I HRE; 1640–1705	Charles Joseph of Austria; 1649–1664
Joseph I HRE; 1678–1711	Charles VI; HRE; 1685–1740
Lorraine
Maria Theresa; HRE; 1740–1780	Francis I HRE; 1745–1765
Habsburg-Lorraine
Joseph II; HRE; 1765–1790	Leopold II; HRE; 1790–1792
Francis II; HRE; 1792–1806

== Bibliography ==
- Gabrielle Caerr-Stamm: Johanna von Pfirt, Gattin des Habsburgers Albrecht II. Herzog von Österreich oder das europäische Schicksal einer Elsässerin ("wife of Habsburg Albert II Duke of Austria or the European Fate of an Alsatian"). Sundgaugeschichtsverein, Riedisheim 1996, ISBN 2-908498-06-5.
- Franz Kurz: Österreich unter Herzog Albrecht dem Lahmen ("Austria under Duke Albert the Lame"), Haslinger, Linz 1819.
- Previté-Orton, C. W. (1952). The Shorter Cambridge Medieval History: The Twelfth Century to the Renaissance. Vol. 2. Cambridge University Press.

Albert II of Austria House of Habsburg Born: 12 December 1298 Died: 16 August 1358
Preceded by Frederick the Fair	Duke of Austria and Styria; 1330 – 1358; With: Otto the Merry 1330 – 1339	Succeeded by Rudolf IV, Duke of Austria
Preceded by Henry of Bohemia	Duke of Carinthia; 1335 – 1358; With: Otto the Merry 1335 – 1339	Succeeded by Rudolf IV, Duke of Austria
