= Othenin of Montbéliard =

Othenin
- Count of Montbéliard
- Died: 1338
- Buried: Church of Saint-Maimbœuf, Montbéliard
- Father: Reginald of Burgundy
- Mother: Guillemette of Neufchâtel

Othenin (died 1338), called the Mad, was a Count of Montbéliard. The only son of Reginald of Burgundy and his wife, Guillemette of Neufchâtel, Othenin could not intervene in the affairs of the county because of his mental problems. He was placed under the tutelage of his uncle, Hugh of Chalon.

He was betrothed to Jeanne, the sister of Jean of Chalone-Auxerre, in 1305 as part of a peace treaty.

He lived in the reclusive Château de Montfaucon (Castle of Montfaucon), near Besançon, until his death. Othenin died in 1338. He was buried in the church of Saint-Maimbœuf Montbéliard.

Henry I of Mountfacon was named his successor by the Holy Roman Emperor Louis IV.

Preceded by Reginald of Burgundy	Count of Montbéliard; 1322–1338	Succeeded by Henry of Montfaucon
