= Leopold III, Duke of Austria =

Duke of Austria from 1365 to 1386

Leopold III the Just
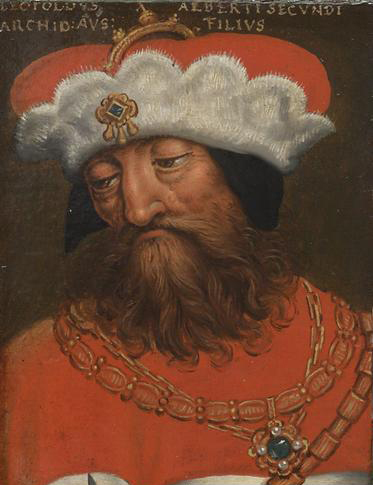
- Leopold III of Austria by Anton Boys, c. 1580

Duke of Austria
- Reign: 1365–1386
- Predecessor: Rudolf IV
- Successor: William
- Born: 1 November 1351; Vienna, Duchy of Austria
- Died: 9 July 1386 (aged 34); Sempach, Swiss Confederacy
- Burial: Saint Paul in Lavanttal Abbey
- Spouse: Viridis Visconti
- Issue: William the Courteous; Leopold IV the Fat; Ernest the Iron; Frederick IV of the Empty Pockets
- House: House of Habsburg
- Father: Albert II of Austria
- Mother: Joanna of Pfirt
- Religion: Roman Catholicism

Leopold III (1 November 1351 – 9 July 1386), known as the Just, a member of the House of Habsburg, was duke of Austria from 1365. As head and progenitor of the Leopoldian line, he ruled over the Inner Austrian duchies of Carinthia, Styria and Carniola as well as the County of Tyrol and Further Austria from 1379 until his death.

== Biography ==
Born in Vienna, Leopold was a younger son of Duke Albert II of Austria (thereby a grandson of King Albert I of Germany), and younger brother of the Dukes Rudolf IV and Albert III. His mother, Joanna of Pfirt, was 51 when she gave birth to him and died shortly after. Upon the death of Albert II, his eldest son Rudolf IV, called the Founder, assumed the rule over the Habsburg dominions, despite the regulations on a joint rule left by his father. Nevertheless, on 18 November 1364 he promulgated his own house law (Rudolfinische Hausordnung), according to which the Austrian "hereditary lands" were again declared a common possession of the brothers, though the eldest received a number of additional rights.

After Rudolf's death on 27 July 1365, Albert III and Leopold (their elder brother Friedrich had died in 1362) assumed the rule over the Habsburg lands, with Albert taking the additional rights as eldest. While Albert ruled, Leopold became a general leading Habsburg troops in battle. In 1368 he defeated a Bavarian incursion into Tirol, bringing all of Tirol under Habsburg authority in 1370. In 1372 Leopold broke with his brother over rights, prestige and income that he felt he was owed. On 25 July 1373 the brothers signed a peace treaty which granted Leopold control over Tirol, Further Austria and Carniola while income would be split between the dukes. In 1375 their relative Enguerrand VII de Coucy led a mercenary army into Alsace and Switzerland to capture the Habsburg possessions of Sundgau, Breisgau and the county of Ferrette in the Gugler war of 1375. After Leopold was unable to defeat his cousin, he retreated to Breisach on the Rhine. A coalition of Swiss cities then attacked and drove the Gugler army out of their country and ended the war.

By 1375 Leopold had inherited the former Gorizia possessions in the Windic March, White Carniola, Friuli and Istria and the city of Feldkirch in Vorarlberg. On 6 August 1376 he was granted the right to make alliances with foreign rulers. In 1377 Albert traveled to Prussia for about five months, leaving Leopold in charge of all the Habsburg lands. During this time, Leopold signed a peace treaty with one of his brother's bitterest rivals, Heinrich von Schaunberg. When on 7 July 1379 he and Albert III signed the Treaty of Neuberg, Leopold became the exclusive ruler of Styria (then including Wiener Neustadt), Carinthia, Carniola, Tyrol and the Further Austrian lands in Swabia. In 1382 he was granted the city of Trieste as part of his payment for defeating Venice.

The Duke significantly promoted trade and commerce in the Tyrolean lands, encouraging the development of cities such as Meran. He gained control over the city of Basel in 1376 and could also purchase Laufenburg from his Swabian Habsburg cousins ten years later. However, his further attempts to expand his position in Switzerland failed, when he was killed in the Battle of Sempach.

Leopold is associated with the hospice of Henry, in 1385 he notified the people of the surrounding area of the Arlberg Pass that one Henry of Kempten will build a lodging for the sake of the poor and transients who seek shelter in the area. In the following year, additional buildings, a chapel and graveyeard were added to the hospice. The Brotherhood of St Christopher eventually ran the hospice. Leopold says "many good things had been brought to pass" by simple folk passing by.

Initially buried in Königsfelden Monastery, his mortal remains were transferred firstly to St. Blaise Abbey in a solemn ceremony on 14 November 1770, and finally to Saint Paul's Abbey, Carinthia.

== Family and children ==
He was married, on 23 February 1365, to Viridis Visconti (1352–1414), second daughter of Bernabò Visconti, Lord of Milan, and Beatrice Regina della Scala. The marriage produced four sons and three daughters including the following:

1. William, Duke of Austria
2. Leopold IV, Duke of Austria
3. Ernest, Duke of Austria
4. Frederick IV, Duke of Austria
5. Elisabeth (1378–1392)
6. Margaretha (1370–?)
7. Catherine (1385–?), Abbess of St. Klara in Vienna

Leopold was succeeded by his eldest son William who died in 1406. Other sons included Leopold, future Duke of Further Austria, Ernest the Iron, future Duke of Inner Austria, and Frederick, future Duke of Further Austria.

== Sources ==
- Lodge, Eleanor Constance (1924). The End of the Middle Age, 1273-1453. Methuen & Company Limited.

Leopold III, Duke of Austria House of Habsburg Born: 1 November 1351 Died: 9 July 1386
Regnal titles
Preceded by Rudolf IV the Founder	Duke of Austria; 1365–1379 with Albert the Pigtail	Succeeded by Albert III the Pigtail as sole duke
Preceded by Rudolf IV the Founder	Duke of Styria, Carinthia and Carniola; Count of Tyrol; 1365–1386 with Albert III the Pigtail (1365–1379)	Succeeded by William the Courteous and Leopold IV the Fat
