= Albert of Austria =

Albert of Austria may refer to:

- Albert I of Germany (1255–1308, r. 1298–1308), King of Germany and Duke of Austria
- Albert II of Austria (1298–1358)
- Albert III of Austria (1349–1395)
- Albert IV of Austria (1377–1404)
- Albert II of Germany (1397–1439), King of Germany, King of Hungary, Croatia and Bohemia, Duke of Austria as Albert V
- Albert VI of Austria (1418–1463)
- Albert VII of Austria (1559–1621), Governor of the Spanish Netherlands
- Archduke Albrecht, Duke of Teschen (1817–1895), Austrian General
