= Leopoldian line =

Habsburg dynasty line of descent beginning with Duke Leopold III of Austria

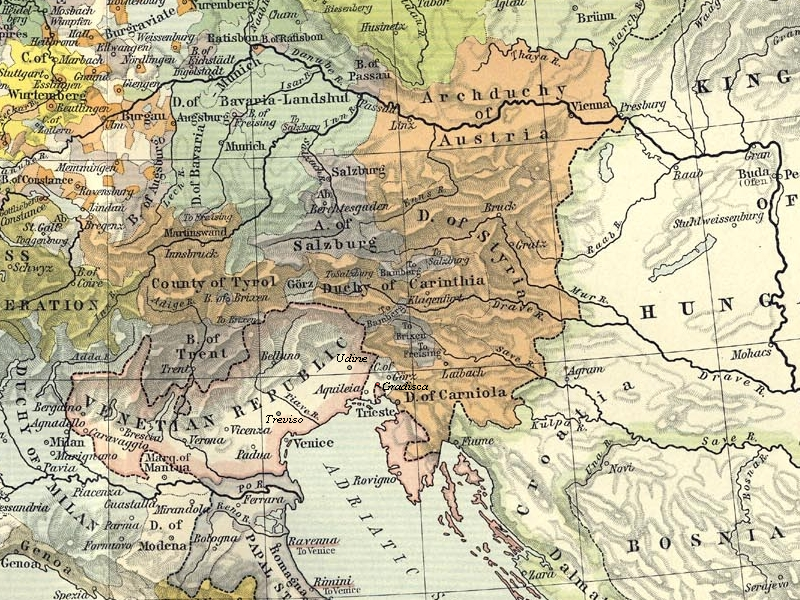
Habsburg dominions (orange) in 1477

The Leopoldian line was a sequence of descent in the Habsburg dynasty begun by Duke Leopold III of Austria. The line of descent followed the death of his elder brother Rudolf IV, who divided the Habsburg hereditary lands with his brother Albert III according to the 1379 Treaty of Neuberg.

== History ==
The division of the Habsburg territories between the elder Albertinian and the younger Leopoldian line occurred after the early death of Duke Rudolf IV in 1365, when his surviving brothers Albert III and Leopold III, after several years of joint rule, divided the dynasty's dominions. The Leopoldian line received the Duchy of Styria, ruled by Austria according to the 1186 Georgenberg Pact, as well as the duchies of Carinthia and Duchy of Carniola, the County of Tyrol, and the original Habsburg estates in the former Duchy of Swabia.

Duke Leopold had four sons; upon his death in 1386 he was initially succeeded by the eldest, William the Courteous, who ten years later had to cede Tyrol and the Swabian estates to the second-born son Leopold IV. Upon William's death in 1406, the remaining territories of Styria, Carinthia and Carniola were inherited by the third-born Ernest the Iron and became known as Inner Austria. Tyrol fell to the youngest brother, Frederick IV, called 'of the Empty Pockets'.

Only the two youngest sons of Leopold III, Ernest the Iron and Frederick IV, had issue. The children of Ernest and his wife, the Piast princess Cymburgis of Masovia, started the most famous line of the Habsburg dynasty to which most subsequent Holy Roman Emperors belonged, including their son Frederick III (V), who officially acknowledged the Austrian archducal title and by 1490 had re-unified all the dynasty's dominions. His descendants, among them Maximilian I and Charles V, ruled the Holy Roman Empire and the Austrian Habsburg monarchy in an unbroken succession until the male line became extinct with the death of Emperor Charles VI in 1740. The line of succession was continued by the last "genuine" Habsburg ruler, Maria Theresa, who became ancestress of the Imperial House of Habsburg-Lorraine.

== Genealogy ==
1. Leopold III (1351–1386), Duke of Austria (jointly with his brother Albert III) from 1365 to 1379, and Duke of Styria, Carinthia and Carniola (Inner Austria) from 1379 until his death
  X Viridis Visconti (1352–1414), daughter of Bernabò Visconti, Lord of Milan
  1. William the Courteous (c.1370–1406), Duke of Carinthia, Styria and Carniola from 1386 until his death
    X Joanna II of Naples (1373–1435), daughter of King Charles III
  2. Leopold IV (1371–1411), Count of Tyrol (as Leopold II) from 1396 to 1406
    X Catherine of Burgundy (1378–1425), daughter of Duke Philip the Bold
  3. Ernest the Iron (1377–1424), Duke of Carinthia, Styria and Carniola from 1406 until his death
    X (1) Margaret of Pomerania (1366–1407/10), daughter of Duke Bogislaw V
    X (2) Cymburgis of Masovia (1394/97–1429), daughter of Duke Siemowit IV
    1. Frederick V (1415–1493), Duke of Carinthia, Styria and Carniola from 1424, Duke of Austria from 1439, elected King of the Romans (as Frederick III) from 1440, and Holy Roman Emperor from 1452 until his death
      X Eleanor of Portugal (1434–1467), daughter of King Edward
      1. Maximilian I (1459–1519), elected King of the Romans from 1486, and Holy Roman Emperor from 1493 until his death→ Habsburg family tree
      2. Kunigunde (1465–1520)
        X Duke Albert IV of Bavaria
    2. Margaret (c.1416–1486)
      X Elector Frederick II of Saxony
    3. Albert VI (1418–1463), Duke of Styria, Carinthia and Carniola (with Frederick V) from 1424, Duke of Austria from 1457 until his death
      X Mechthild (1418–1482), daughter of Elector Palatine Louis III
    4. Catherine (1420–1493)
      X Margrave Charles I of Baden-Baden
  4. Frederick of the Empty Pockets (1382–1439), Count of Tyrol from 1406 until his death (Elder Tyrol line)
    X (1) Elizabeth (1381–1408), daughter of King Rupert of Germany
    X (2) Anna of Brunswick (c.1390–1432), daughter of Duke Frederick I of Brunswick-Wolfenbüttel
    1. Sigismund (1427–1496), Count of Tyrol from 1439, resigned in 1490
      X (1) Eleanor of Scotland (1433–1480), daughter of King James I
      X (2) Catherine of Saxony (1468–1524), daughter of Duke Albert III

== Male-line family tree ==
House of Habsburg

Original line
Albert; Count of Habsburg c. 1188–1239
Rudolf I of Germany c. 1218–1291
Albert I of Germany; 1255–1308	Hartmann; 1263–1281	Rudolf II; Duke of Austria; 1270–1290
Rudolf I of Bohemia; 1281–1307	Frederick the Fair c. 1289–1330	Leopold I Duke of Austria; 1290–1326	Albert II; Duke of Austria; 1298–1358	Henry the Friendly; 1299–1327	Otto; Duke of Austria; 1301–1339	John; Parricida c. 1290–1312/1313
Albertinian line	Leopoldian line
Rudolf IV; Duke of Austria; 1339–1365	Frederick III; 1347–1362	Albert III; Duke of Austria; 1349–1395	Leopold III; Duke of Austria; 1351–1386	Frederick II; Duke of Austria; 1327–1344	Leopold II; Duke of Austria; 1328–1344
Albert IV; Duke of Austria; 1377–1404	William; Duke of Austria c. 1370–1406	Leopold IV; Duke of Austria; 1371–1411	Ernest; Duke of Austria; 1377–1424	Frederick IV; Duke of Austria; 1382–1439
Albert II of Germany; 1397–1439	Frederick III; HRE; 1415–1493	Albert VI; Archduke of Austria; 1418–1463	Sigismund; Archduke of Austria; 1427–1496
Ladislaus the Posthumous; 1440–1457	Maximilian I HRE; 1459–1519
Philip I of Castile; 1478–1506
Spanish / Iberian line	Austrian / HRE line
Charles V HRE; 1500–1558	Ferdinand I HRE; 1503–1564
Philip II of Spain; 1527–1598	Maximilian II; HRE; 1527–1576	Ferdinand II; Archduke of Austria; 1529–1595	Charles II; Archduke of Austria; 1540–1590
Carlos; Prince of Asturias; 1545–1568	Philip III of Spain; 1578–1621	Rudolf II; HRE; 1552–1612	Ernest of Austria; 1553–1595	Matthias; HRE; 1557–1619	Maximilian III; Archduke of Austria; 1558–1618	Albert VII; Archduke of Austria; 1559–1621	Wenceslaus; Archduke of Austria; 1561–1578	Andrew; Margrave of Burgau; 1558–1600	Charles; Margrave of Burgau; 1560–1618	Ferdinand II; HRE; 1578–1637	Maximilian Ernest of Austria; 1583–1616	Leopold V Archduke of Austria; 1586–1632	Charles of Austria; 1590–1624
Philip IV of Spain; 1605–1665	Charles of Austria; 1607–1632	Ferdinand of Austria; 1609–1641	John-Charles of Austria; 1605–1619	Ferdinand III; HRE; 1608–1657	Leopold Wilhelm of Austria; 1614–1662	Ferdinand Charles; Archduke of Austria; 1628–1662	Sigismund Francis; Archduke of Austria; 1630–1665
Balthasar Charles; Prince of Asturias; 1629–1646	Charles II of Spain; 1661–1700	Ferdinand IV; King of the Romans; 1633–1654	Leopold I HRE; 1640–1705	Charles Joseph of Austria; 1649–1664
Joseph I HRE; 1678–1711	Charles VI; HRE; 1685–1740
Lorraine
Maria Theresa; HRE; 1740–1780	Francis I HRE; 1745–1765
Habsburg-Lorraine
Joseph II; HRE; 1765–1790	Leopold II; HRE; 1790–1792
Francis II; HRE; 1792–1806
