= Archduke Ernest of Austria =

Austrian nobleman (1553–1595)

Ernest of Austria
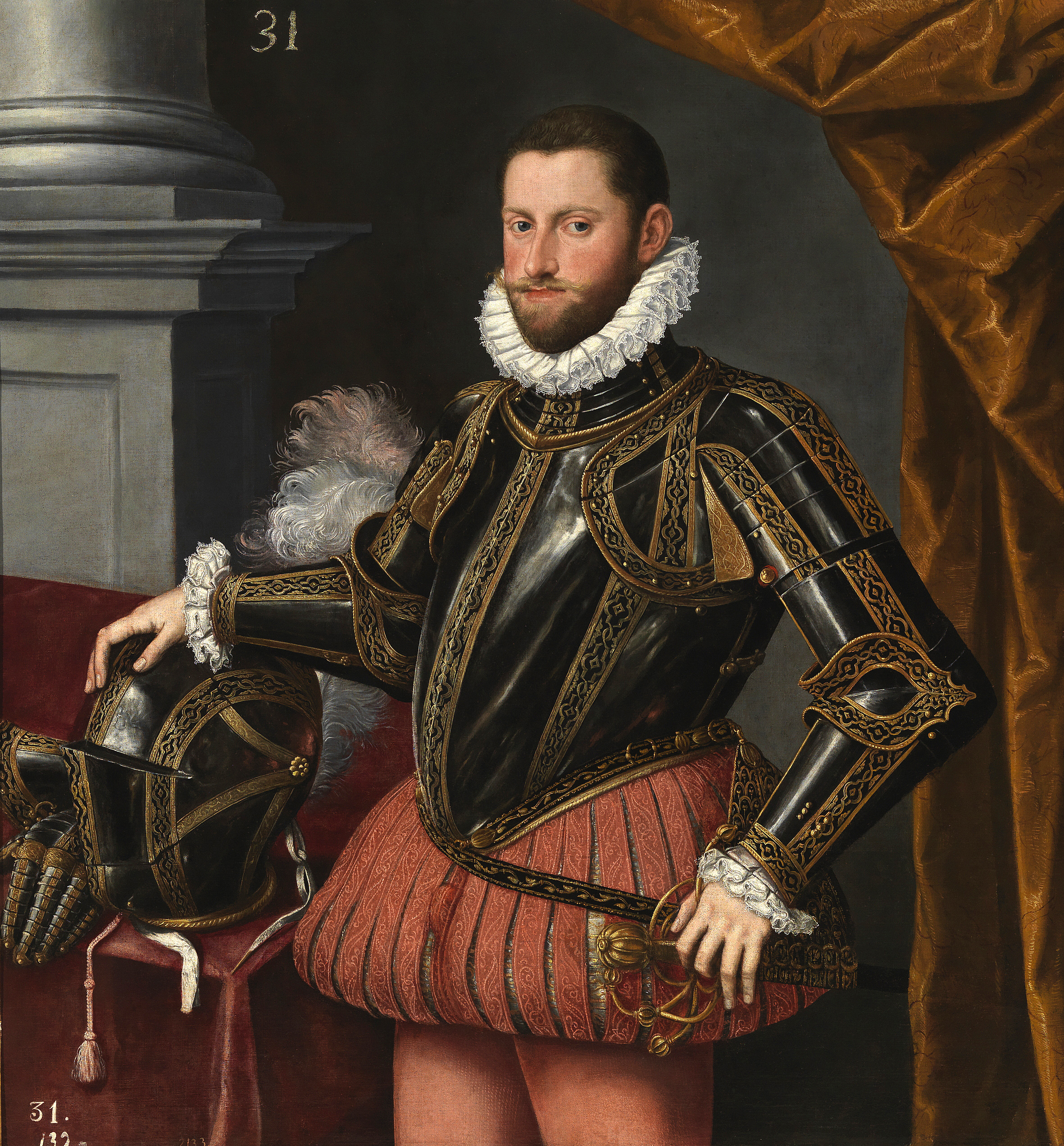
- Portrait by Martino Rota c. 1580
- Born: 15 June 1553; Vienna, Archduchy of Austria
- Died: 20 February 1595 (aged 41); Brussels, Duchy of Brabant
- House: Habsburg
- Father: Maximilian II, Holy Roman Emperor
- Mother: Maria of Spain

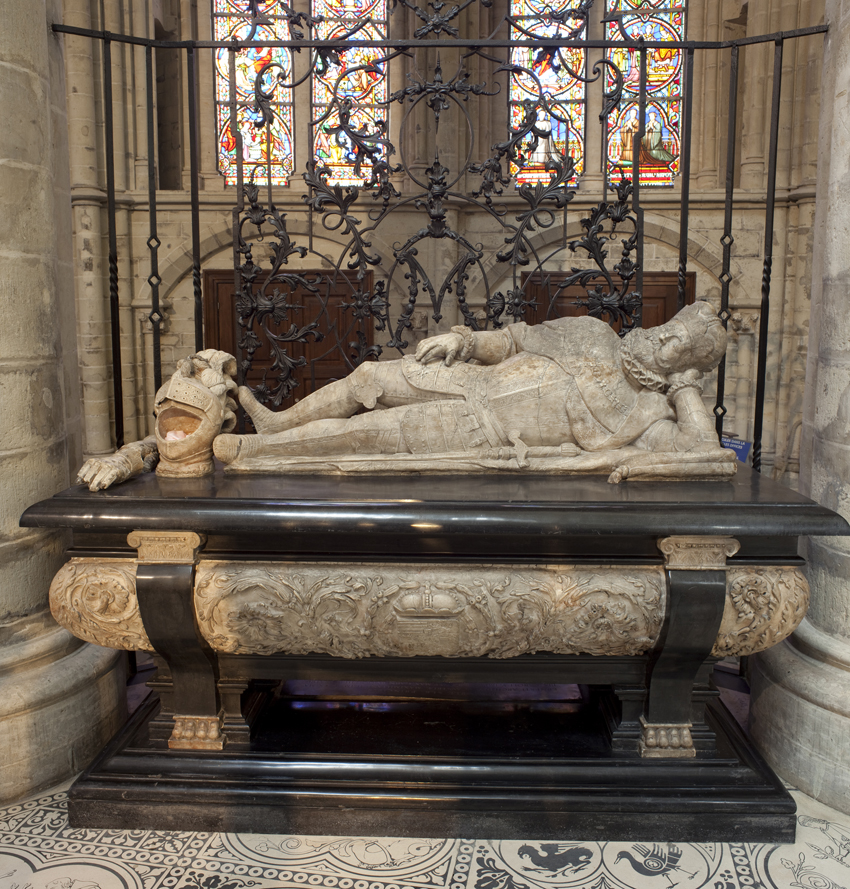
Tomb of Archduke Ernest of Austria

Archduke Ernest of Austria (German: Ernst von Österreich; 15 June 1553 – 20 February 1595) was an Austrian prince, the son of Maximilian II, Holy Roman Emperor, and Maria of Spain.

== Biography ==
Born in Vienna, he was educated with his brother Rudolf II, Holy Roman Emperor, in the court of Spain. He was a candidate in the 1573 Polish–Lithuanian royal election for the throne of Poland. He lost his election as the Polish nobility feared that he might attempt to become an autocrat and revoke the privileges that Polish nobles enjoyed. From 1576 onwards, he was governor in the Archduchy of Austria, where he promoted the Counter-Reformation. In 1590, he became governor of Inner Austria as regent for his young cousin Ferdinand, and from 1594 to 1595 he served as Governor of the Spanish Netherlands.

He died in Brussels on 20 February 1595 and was eventually succeeded in the Netherlands by his brother Albert. Ernest owned the Months of the Year cycle series of works painted by Pieter Bruegel the Elder; one painting, High Spring (showing April or May), is lost).

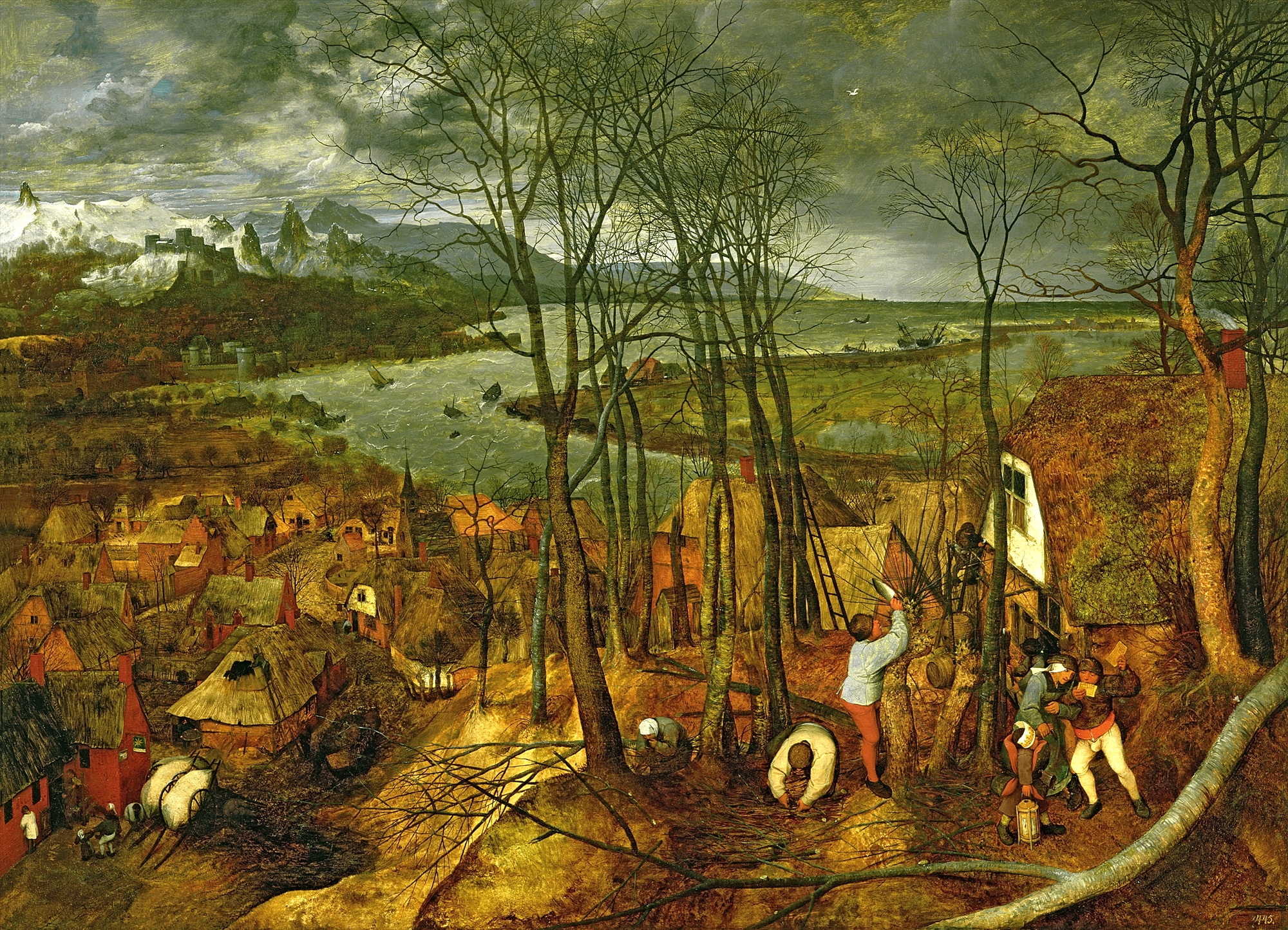
The Gloomy Day (February/March)

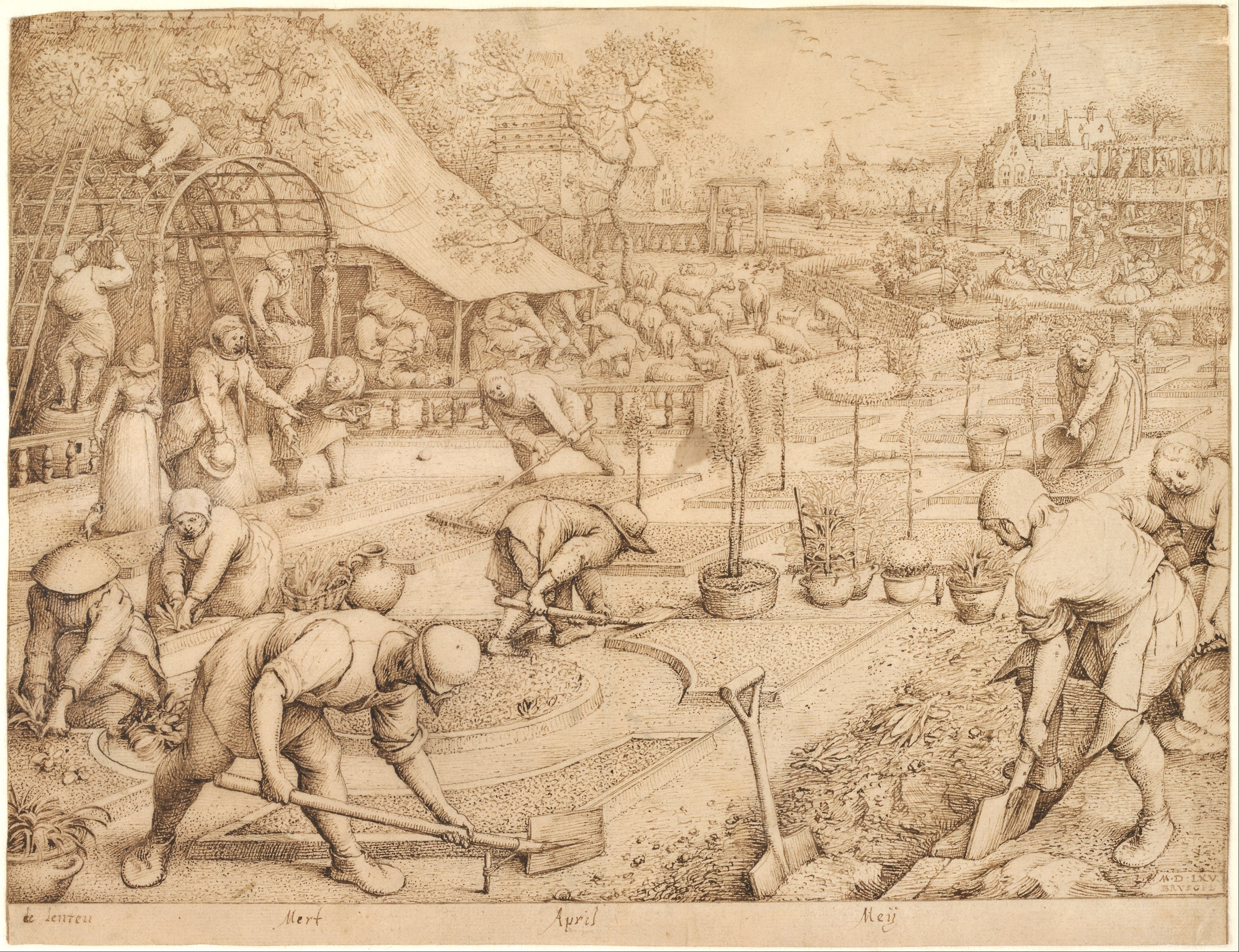
A 1565 Brugel sketch "Spring" – although not part of the Months cycle series it could very well be similar to what Bruegel had in mind when he painted "High Spring" (April/May)

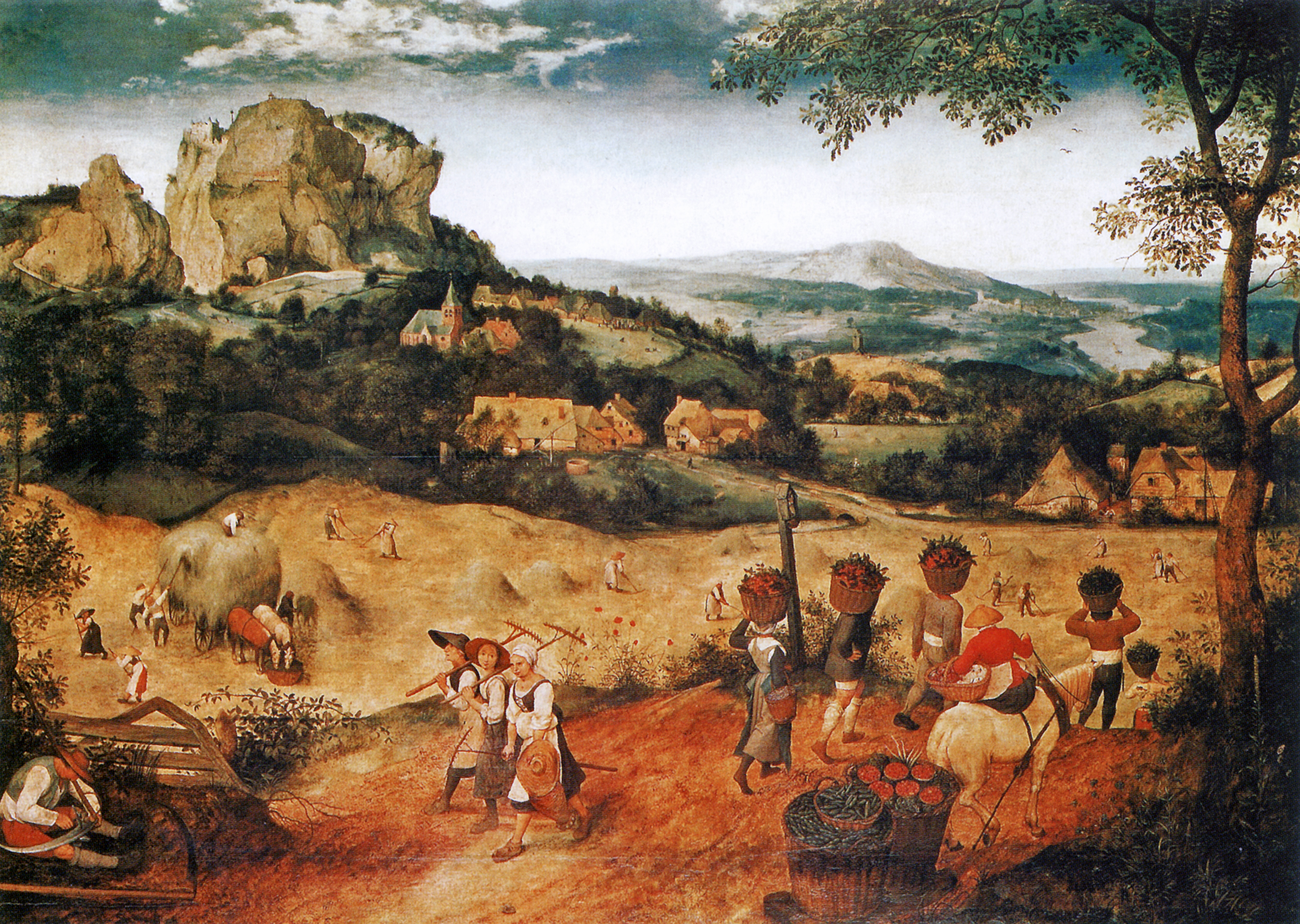
The Hay Harvest (June/July)

The Harvesters (August/September)

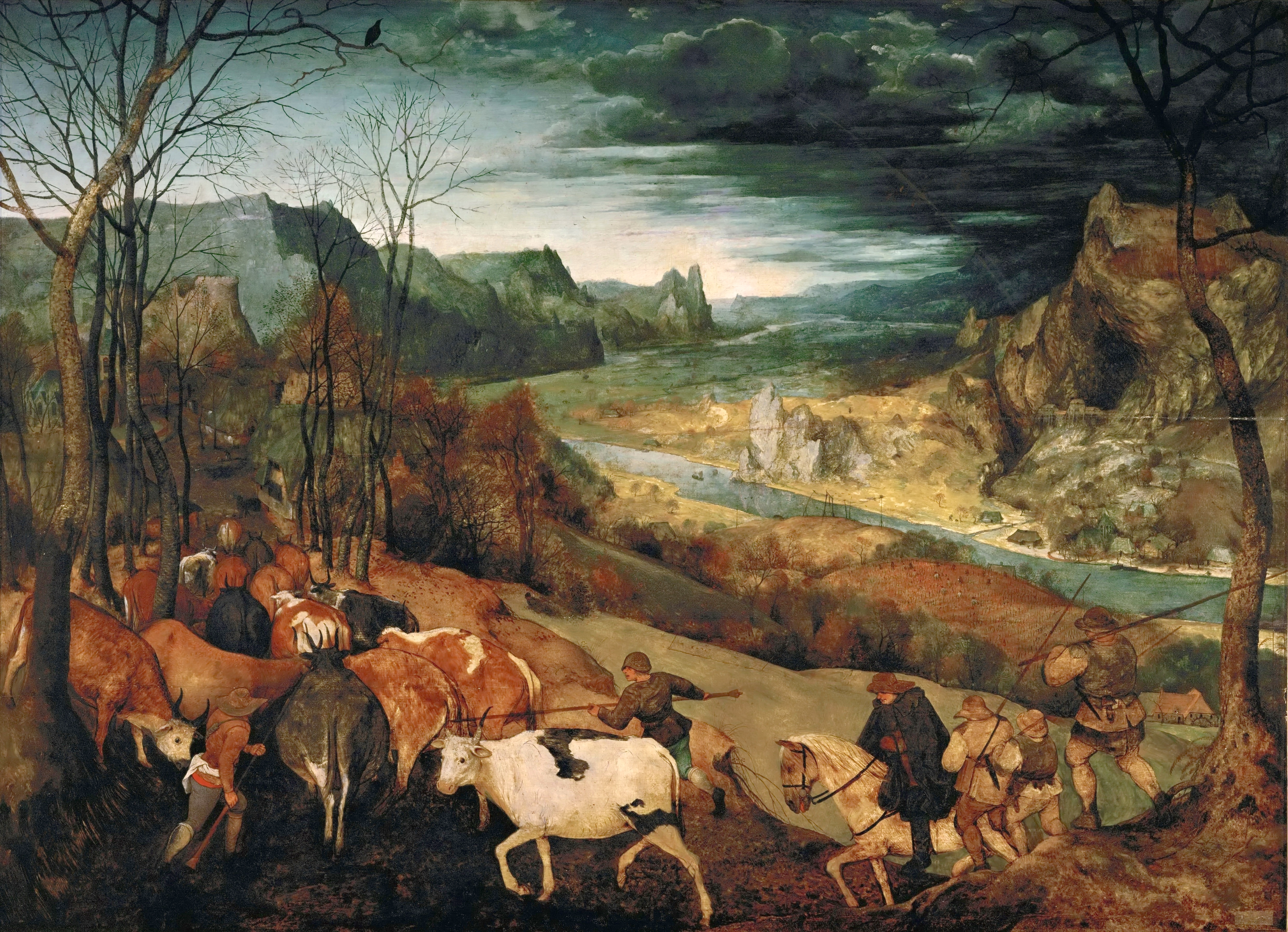
The Return of the Herd (October/November)

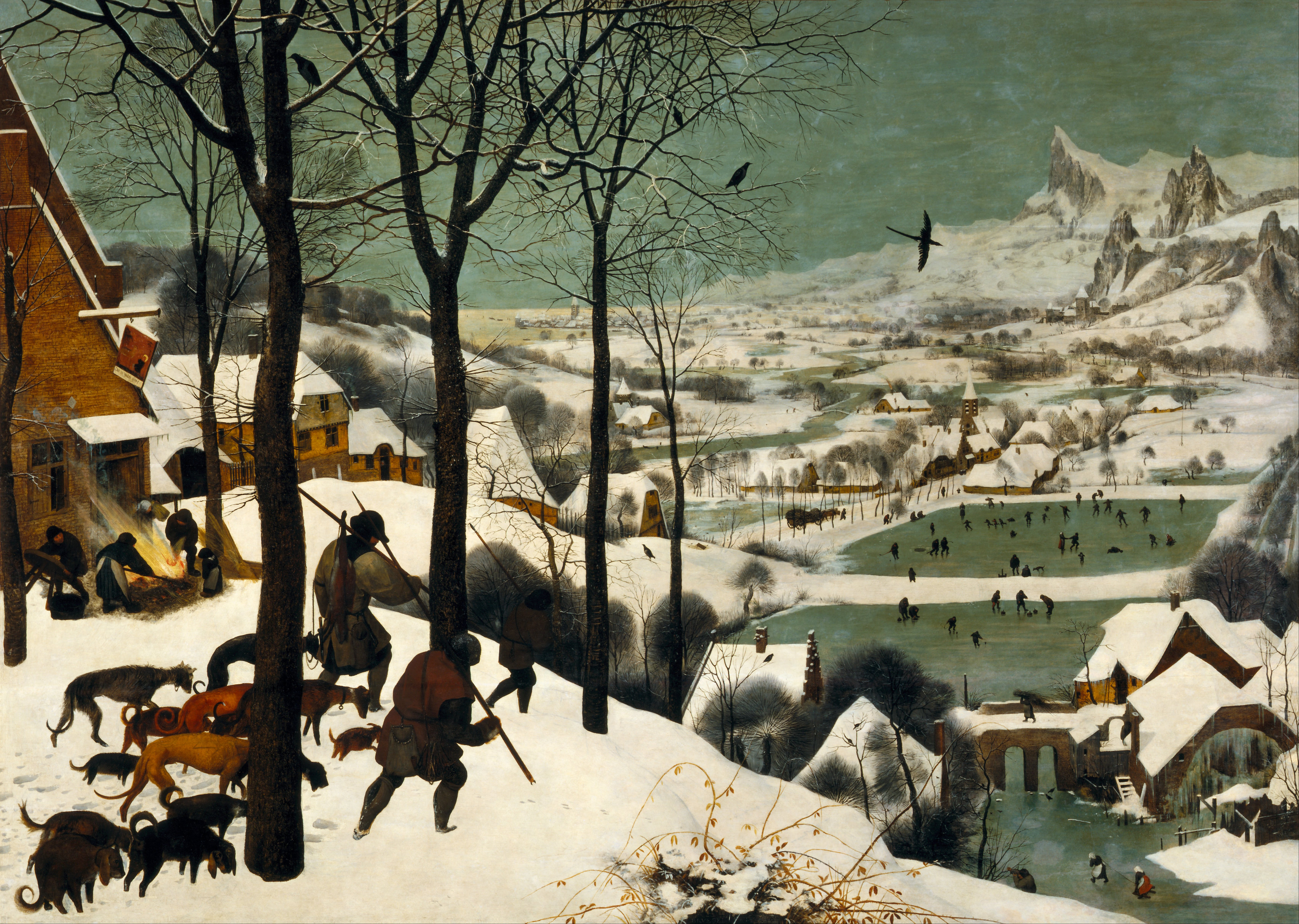
The Hunters in the Snow (December/January)

== Ancestry ==
Ancestors of Archduke Ernest of Austria

8. Philip I of Castile
4. Ferdinand I, Holy Roman Emperor
9. Joanna I of Castile
2. Maximilian II, Holy Roman Emperor
10. Vladislas II of Bohemia and Hungary
5. Anne of Bohemia and Hungary
11. Anne of Foix-Candale
1. Archduke Ernest of Austria
12. Philip I of Castile (= 8)
6. Charles V, Holy Roman Emperor
13. Joanna I of Castile (= 9)
3. Maria of Austria
14. Manuel I of Portugal
7. Isabella of Portugal
15. Maria of Aragon

== Male-line family tree ==
House of Habsburg

Original line
Albert; Count of Habsburg c. 1188–1239
Rudolf I of Germany c. 1218–1291
Albert I of Germany; 1255–1308	Hartmann; 1263–1281	Rudolf II; Duke of Austria; 1270–1290
Rudolf I of Bohemia; 1281–1307	Frederick the Fair c. 1289–1330	Leopold I Duke of Austria; 1290–1326	Albert II; Duke of Austria; 1298–1358	Henry the Friendly; 1299–1327	Otto; Duke of Austria; 1301–1339	John; Parricida c. 1290–1312/1313
Albertinian line	Leopoldian line
Rudolf IV; Duke of Austria; 1339–1365	Frederick III; 1347–1362	Albert III; Duke of Austria; 1349–1395	Leopold III; Duke of Austria; 1351–1386	Frederick II; Duke of Austria; 1327–1344	Leopold II; Duke of Austria; 1328–1344
Albert IV; Duke of Austria; 1377–1404	William; Duke of Austria c. 1370–1406	Leopold IV; Duke of Austria; 1371–1411	Ernest; Duke of Austria; 1377–1424	Frederick IV; Duke of Austria; 1382–1439
Albert II of Germany; 1397–1439	Frederick III; HRE; 1415–1493	Albert VI; Archduke of Austria; 1418–1463	Sigismund; Archduke of Austria; 1427–1496
Ladislaus the Posthumous; 1440–1457	Maximilian I HRE; 1459–1519
Philip I of Castile; 1478–1506
Spanish / Iberian line	Austrian / HRE line
Charles V HRE; 1500–1558	Ferdinand I HRE; 1503–1564
Philip II of Spain; 1527–1598	Maximilian II; HRE; 1527–1576	Ferdinand II; Archduke of Austria; 1529–1595	Charles II; Archduke of Austria; 1540–1590
Carlos; Prince of Asturias; 1545–1568	Philip III of Spain; 1578–1621	Rudolf II; HRE; 1552–1612	Ernest of Austria; 1553–1595	Matthias; HRE; 1557–1619	Maximilian III; Archduke of Austria; 1558–1618	Albert VII; Archduke of Austria; 1559–1621	Wenceslaus; Archduke of Austria; 1561–1578	Andrew; Margrave of Burgau; 1558–1600	Charles; Margrave of Burgau; 1560–1618	Ferdinand II; HRE; 1578–1637	Maximilian Ernest of Austria; 1583–1616	Leopold V Archduke of Austria; 1586–1632	Charles of Austria; 1590–1624
Philip IV of Spain; 1605–1665	Charles of Austria; 1607–1632	Ferdinand of Austria; 1609–1641	John-Charles of Austria; 1605–1619	Ferdinand III; HRE; 1608–1657	Leopold Wilhelm of Austria; 1614–1662	Ferdinand Charles; Archduke of Austria; 1628–1662	Sigismund Francis; Archduke of Austria; 1630–1665
Balthasar Charles; Prince of Asturias; 1629–1646	Charles II of Spain; 1661–1700	Ferdinand IV; King of the Romans; 1633–1654	Leopold I HRE; 1640–1705	Charles Joseph of Austria; 1649–1664
Joseph I HRE; 1678–1711	Charles VI; HRE; 1685–1740
Lorraine
Maria Theresa; HRE; 1740–1780	Francis I HRE; 1745–1765
Habsburg-Lorraine
Joseph II; HRE; 1765–1790	Leopold II; HRE; 1790–1792
Francis II; HRE; 1792–1806

Notes:

Government offices
Preceded by Peter Ernst I von Mansfeld-Vorderort	Governor of the Habsburg Netherlands; 1594–1595	Succeeded by Pedro Henriquez de Acevedo
