= Rudolf I of Bohemia =

King of Bohemia from 1306 to 1307

Rudolf I
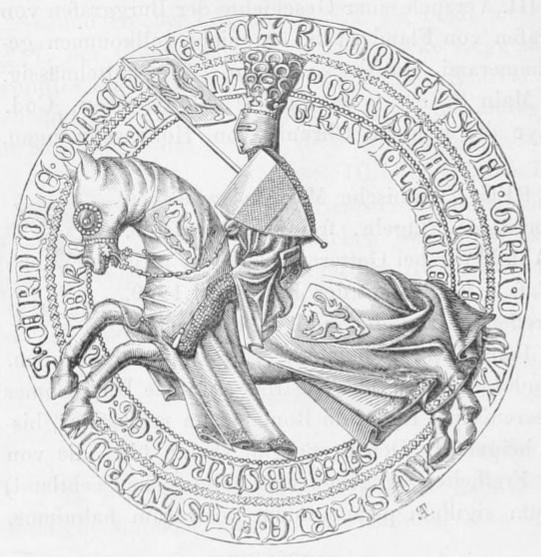
- Rudolf's effigy on a seal

King of Bohemia
- Reign: 1306 – 3/4 July 1307
- Predecessor: Wenceslaus III
- Successor: Henry

Duke of Austria and Styria
- Reign: 21 November 1298 – 3/4 July 1307
- Predecessor: Albert I
- Successor: Albert I
- Born: c. 1281
- Died: 3/4 July 1307 (aged 26); Horažďovice, Bohemia
- Burial: St. Vitus Cathedral, Prague
- Spouse: Blanche of France; Elisabeth Richeza
- Issue: 2 (with Blanche)
- House: Habsburg
- Father: Albert I of Germany
- Mother: Elizabeth of Carinthia

Rudolf I (c. 1282 – 3/4 July 1307), also known as Rudolf of Habsburg, was a member of the House of Habsburg, the King of Bohemia and titular King of Poland from 1306 until his death. He was also Duke of Austria (as Rudolf III) and Styria from 1298.

== Early life ==
Rudolf was the eldest son of Duke Albert I of Austria and his wife Elizabeth of Gorizia-Tyrol, thereby the grandson of King Rudolf I of Germany. After lengthy struggles with Adolf of Nassau, his father was elected King of Germany in 1298 and vested sixteen-year-old Rudolf as a co-ruler with the Austrian hereditary lands of the Habsburg dynasty. According to the Treaty of Rheinfelden, Rudolf acted as regent on behalf of his younger brothers Frederick the Fair and Leopold I.

On 25 May 1300 King Albert I arranged his marriage with Blanche, a daughter of King Philip III of France. The intended union failed as the couple's son and daughter died young and Blanche herself died, probably after a miscarriage or premature birth, in 1305. Rudolf accompanied his father on his 1304 expedition against King Wenceslaus II of Bohemia, who had placed his son Wenceslaus III on the Hungarian throne after the Árpád dynasty died out in 1301 with the death of King Andrew III.

== King of Bohemia ==
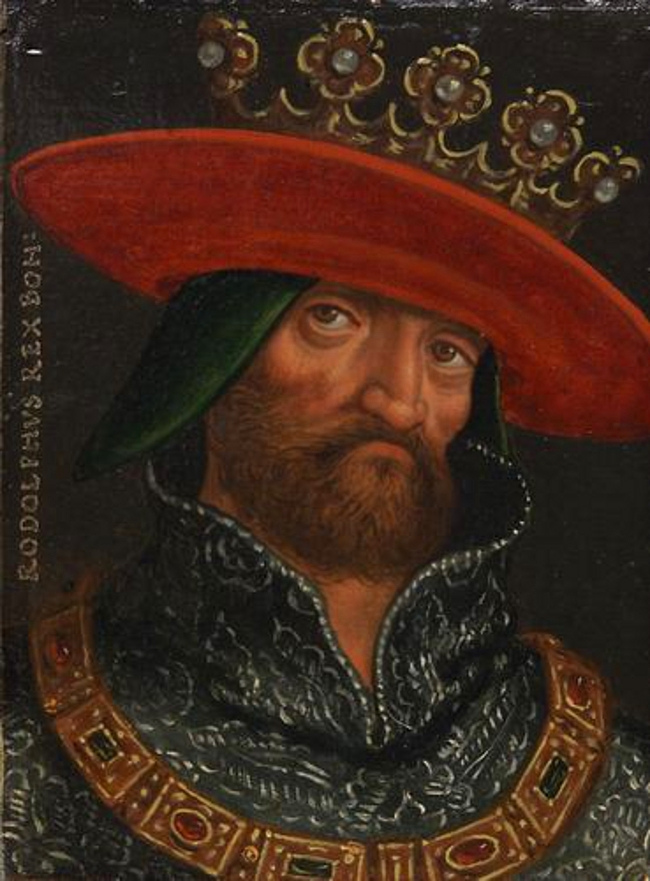
Rudolph III of Habsburg

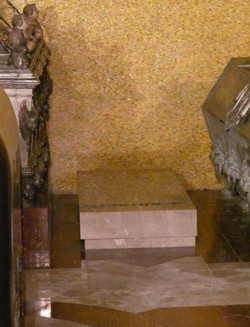
Rudolph's grave in St. Vitus Cathedral in Prague

Another opportunity for a Habsburg gain in power opened when in 1306 King Wenceslaus III, the last Bohemian ruler of the Přemyslid dynasty, was killed and Albert I was able to seize his kingdom as an escheated fief. Rudolph was then vested with the Bohemian throne. This was contested by his maternal uncle Duke Henry of Carinthia, husband of Wenceslaus' sister Anne. When several Bohemian nobles elected Henry King of Bohemia, Albert I placed his brother-in-law under the Imperial ban and marched against Prague. Henry fled, first to Bavaria, then back to his Carinthian homelands. To further legitimate the Habsburg claims to the Bohemian and the Polish throne, Albert had Rudolph married to Elizabeth Richeza of Poland, widow of King Wenceslaus II.

Mocked as král kaše ("king porridge") for his thriftiness rather than stomach problems, Rudolf was rejected by several Bohemian nobles, who continued to hold out for Henry. His aims to take hold of the silver deposits at Kutná Hora (Kuttenberg) sparked a rebellion led by the noble House of Strakonice. The king besieged the rebel fortress of Horažďovice, but died at the campsite in the night of 3 to 4 July 1307, probably of gastrointestinal perforation.

As Rudolf left no surviving children, the first grab of the Habsburgs for the Crown of Saint Wenceslas failed when the Bohemian nobles restored Henry as king in return for a charter of privileges, who in turn had to renounce the throne in favour of Count John of Luxembourg three years later. Instead Rudolph's enfeoffment intensified the inner Habsburg inheritance conflict, culminating in the assassination of King Albert I by his nephew John Parricida in 1308. Rudolph is buried at the St. Vitus Cathedral in Prague.

== Marriages and children ==
In 1298 or 1300 Rudolph married Blanche, daughter of Philip III of France. They had two children, both of whom died at birth or shortly after.

On 16 October 1306 Rudolph married Elizabeth Richeza of Poland. There is one record that says the Queen gave birth to a son after her husband's death. If true, the Prince died soon after birth, as his claims to the throne were never brought up by Habsburgs.

== Male-line family tree ==
House of Habsburg

Original line
Albert; Count of Habsburg c. 1188–1239
Rudolf I of Germany c. 1218–1291
Albert I of Germany; 1255–1308	Hartmann; 1263–1281	Rudolf II; Duke of Austria; 1270–1290
Rudolf I of Bohemia; 1281–1307	Frederick the Fair c. 1289–1330	Leopold I Duke of Austria; 1290–1326	Albert II; Duke of Austria; 1298–1358	Henry the Friendly; 1299–1327	Otto; Duke of Austria; 1301–1339	John; Parricida c. 1290–1312/1313
Albertinian line	Leopoldian line
Rudolf IV; Duke of Austria; 1339–1365	Frederick III; 1347–1362	Albert III; Duke of Austria; 1349–1395	Leopold III; Duke of Austria; 1351–1386	Frederick II; Duke of Austria; 1327–1344	Leopold II; Duke of Austria; 1328–1344
Albert IV; Duke of Austria; 1377–1404	William; Duke of Austria c. 1370–1406	Leopold IV; Duke of Austria; 1371–1411	Ernest; Duke of Austria; 1377–1424	Frederick IV; Duke of Austria; 1382–1439
Albert II of Germany; 1397–1439	Frederick III; HRE; 1415–1493	Albert VI; Archduke of Austria; 1418–1463	Sigismund; Archduke of Austria; 1427–1496
Ladislaus the Posthumous; 1440–1457	Maximilian I HRE; 1459–1519
Philip I of Castile; 1478–1506
Spanish / Iberian line	Austrian / HRE line
Charles V HRE; 1500–1558	Ferdinand I HRE; 1503–1564
Philip II of Spain; 1527–1598	Maximilian II; HRE; 1527–1576	Ferdinand II; Archduke of Austria; 1529–1595	Charles II; Archduke of Austria; 1540–1590
Carlos; Prince of Asturias; 1545–1568	Philip III of Spain; 1578–1621	Rudolf II; HRE; 1552–1612	Ernest of Austria; 1553–1595	Matthias; HRE; 1557–1619	Maximilian III; Archduke of Austria; 1558–1618	Albert VII; Archduke of Austria; 1559–1621	Wenceslaus; Archduke of Austria; 1561–1578	Andrew; Margrave of Burgau; 1558–1600	Charles; Margrave of Burgau; 1560–1618	Ferdinand II; HRE; 1578–1637	Maximilian Ernest of Austria; 1583–1616	Leopold V Archduke of Austria; 1586–1632	Charles of Austria; 1590–1624
Philip IV of Spain; 1605–1665	Charles of Austria; 1607–1632	Ferdinand of Austria; 1609–1641	John-Charles of Austria; 1605–1619	Ferdinand III; HRE; 1608–1657	Leopold Wilhelm of Austria; 1614–1662	Ferdinand Charles; Archduke of Austria; 1628–1662	Sigismund Francis; Archduke of Austria; 1630–1665
Balthasar Charles; Prince of Asturias; 1629–1646	Charles II of Spain; 1661–1700	Ferdinand IV; King of the Romans; 1633–1654	Leopold I HRE; 1640–1705	Charles Joseph of Austria; 1649–1664
Joseph I HRE; 1678–1711	Charles VI; HRE; 1685–1740
Lorraine
Maria Theresa; HRE; 1740–1780	Francis I HRE; 1745–1765
Habsburg-Lorraine
Joseph II; HRE; 1765–1790	Leopold II; HRE; 1790–1792
Francis II; HRE; 1792–1806

== Sources ==
- Morrison, Elizabeth; Hedeman, Anne Dawson, eds. (2010). Imagining the Past in France: History in Manuscript Painting, 1250-1500. J. Paul Getty Museum.

Rudolf I of Bohemia House of Habsburg Born: c. 1281 Died: 3 or 4 July 1307
Preceded by Henry	King of Bohemia; 1306–1307	Succeeded by Henry
Preceded by Albert I (alone)	Duke of Austria and Styria; Count of Habsburg with Albert I 1298–1307	Succeeded by Albert I (alone)
