= Ferdinand IV, King of the Romans =

King of the Romans from 1653 to 1654

Ferdinand IV
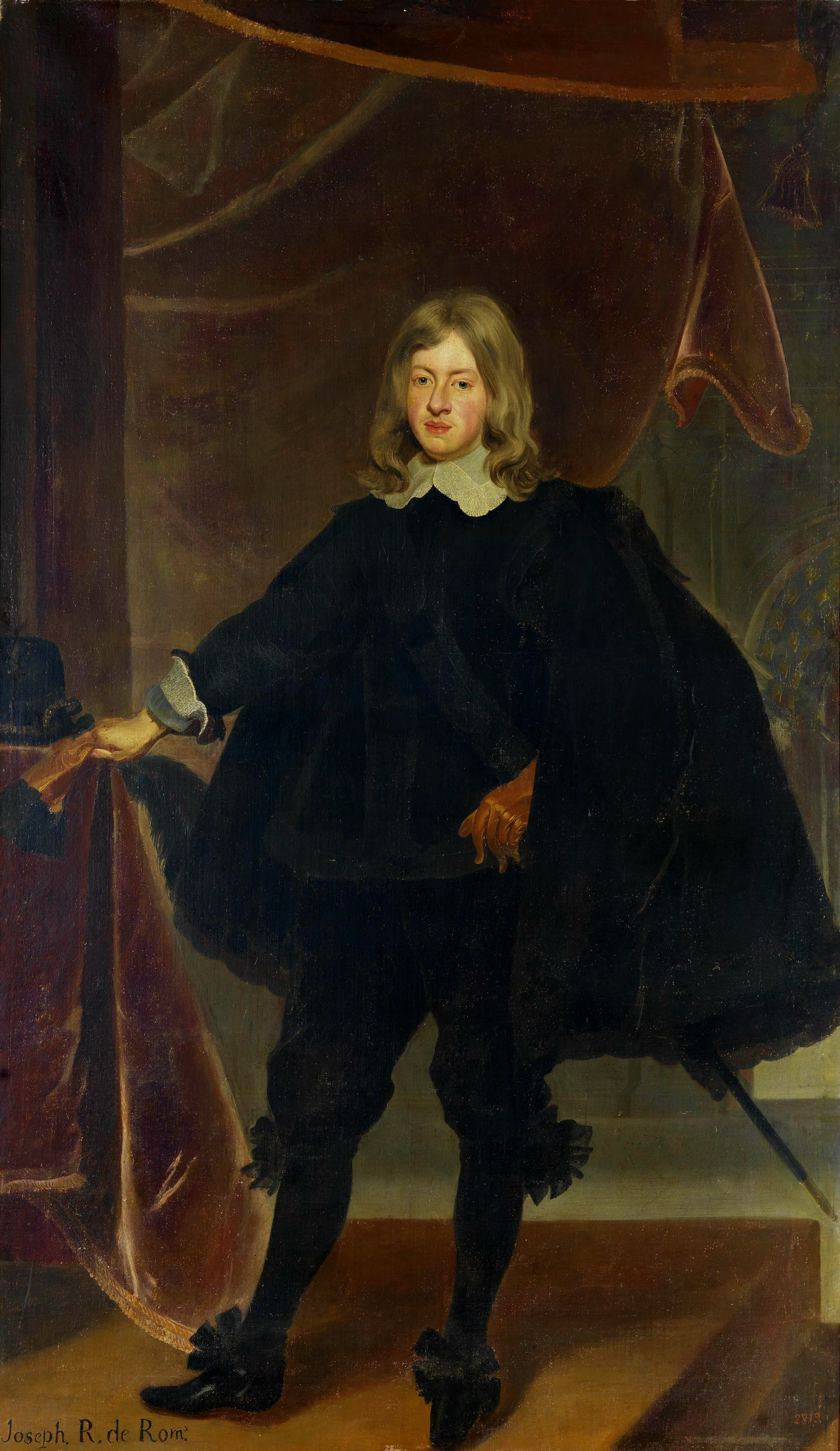
- Portrait by Frans Luycx, c. 1647-48

King of the Romans
- Reign: 31 May 1653 – 9 July 1654
- Predecessor: Ferdinand III
- Successor: Ferdinand III
- Co-ruler: Ferdinand III

King of Hungary and Croatia
- Reign: 16 June 1647 – 9 July 1654
- Predecessor: Ferdinand III
- Successor: Ferdinand III
- Co-ruler: Ferdinand III
- Born: 8 September 1633; Vienna, Archduchy of Austria, Holy Roman Empire
- Died: 9 July 1654 (aged 20); Vienna, Archduchy of Austria, Holy Roman Empire
- House: Habsburg
- Father: Ferdinand III, Holy Roman Emperor
- Mother: Maria Anna of Spain
- Religion: Roman Catholicism

Ferdinand IV (8 September 1633 – 9 July 1654) was made and crowned King of Bohemia in 1646, King of Hungary and Croatia in 1647, and King of the Romans on 31 May 1653. He also served as Duke of Cieszyn.

== Early life ==
Born in Vienna on 8 September 1633, and baptised as Ferdinand Franz, Ferdinand IV was the eldest son of Ferdinand III, Holy Roman Emperor and his first wife Maria Anna, the daughter of Philip III of Spain.

== Biography ==
Ferdinand had been the hope of the Habsburg dynasty during the final stages of the Thirty Years' War. According to his father Emperor Ferdinand III's succession plan, he was expected to lead the Habsburg monarchy into a period of stability after the Peace of Westphalia.

At a young age, Ferdinand IV took his father's place as Archduke of Austria. In 1646, Ferdinand IV became King of Bohemia, sharing the role and that of Duke of Cieszyn with his father Emperor Ferdinand III. He was crowned on 5 August 1646. Ferdinand IV also shared the role of King of Hungary and Croatia with his father; his coronation took place on 16 June 1647 in Pressburg, present-day Slovakia.

After the French attempted to modify the system of the election of King of the Romans, Emperor Ferdinand III took advantage of a recent decline in the prestige of France, and was able to install Ferdinand IV as King of the Romans, and de facto heir to the Holy Roman Empire in the 1653 imperial election. He was crowned in Ratisbon (Regensburg, present-day south-east Germany) on 18 June 1653 after gaining the position on 31 May 1653. However, Ferdinand IV unexpectedly died of smallpox in Vienna on 9 July 1654. Prior to his death, it was planned that he would marry Philip IV of Spain's daughter Maria Theresa of Spain, his cousin. Upon the death of Ferdinand III, Leopold was elected as Holy Roman Emperor.

== Ancestors ==
Ancestors of Ferdinand IV, King of the Romans

8. Charles II, Archduke of Inner Austria
4. Ferdinand II, Holy Roman Emperor
9. Maria Anna of Bavaria (= 15, ≠ 5)
2. Ferdinand III, Holy Roman Emperor
10. William V, Duke of Bavaria
5. Maria Anna of Bavaria (≠ 9, 15)
11. Renata of Lorraine
1. Ferdinand IV, King of the Romans
12. Philip II of Spain
6. Philip III of Spain
13. Anna of Austria
3. Maria Anna of Austria
14. Charles II, Archduke of Inner Austria (= 8)
7. Margaret of Austria
15. Maria Anna of Bavaria (= 9, ≠ 5)

== Male-line family tree ==
House of Habsburg

Original line
Albert; Count of Habsburg c. 1188–1239
Rudolf I of Germany c. 1218–1291
Albert I of Germany; 1255–1308	Hartmann; 1263–1281	Rudolf II; Duke of Austria; 1270–1290
Rudolf I of Bohemia; 1281–1307	Frederick the Fair c. 1289–1330	Leopold I Duke of Austria; 1290–1326	Albert II; Duke of Austria; 1298–1358	Henry the Friendly; 1299–1327	Otto; Duke of Austria; 1301–1339	John; Parricida c. 1290–1312/1313
Albertinian line	Leopoldian line
Rudolf IV; Duke of Austria; 1339–1365	Frederick III; 1347–1362	Albert III; Duke of Austria; 1349–1395	Leopold III; Duke of Austria; 1351–1386	Frederick II; Duke of Austria; 1327–1344	Leopold II; Duke of Austria; 1328–1344
Albert IV; Duke of Austria; 1377–1404	William; Duke of Austria c. 1370–1406	Leopold IV; Duke of Austria; 1371–1411	Ernest; Duke of Austria; 1377–1424	Frederick IV; Duke of Austria; 1382–1439
Albert II of Germany; 1397–1439	Frederick III; HRE; 1415–1493	Albert VI; Archduke of Austria; 1418–1463	Sigismund; Archduke of Austria; 1427–1496
Ladislaus the Posthumous; 1440–1457	Maximilian I HRE; 1459–1519
Philip I of Castile; 1478–1506
Spanish / Iberian line	Austrian / HRE line
Charles V HRE; 1500–1558	Ferdinand I HRE; 1503–1564
Philip II of Spain; 1527–1598	Maximilian II; HRE; 1527–1576	Ferdinand II; Archduke of Austria; 1529–1595	Charles II; Archduke of Austria; 1540–1590
Carlos; Prince of Asturias; 1545–1568	Philip III of Spain; 1578–1621	Rudolf II; HRE; 1552–1612	Ernest of Austria; 1553–1595	Matthias; HRE; 1557–1619	Maximilian III; Archduke of Austria; 1558–1618	Albert VII; Archduke of Austria; 1559–1621	Wenceslaus; Archduke of Austria; 1561–1578	Andrew; Margrave of Burgau; 1558–1600	Charles; Margrave of Burgau; 1560–1618	Ferdinand II; HRE; 1578–1637	Maximilian Ernest of Austria; 1583–1616	Leopold V Archduke of Austria; 1586–1632	Charles of Austria; 1590–1624
Philip IV of Spain; 1605–1665	Charles of Austria; 1607–1632	Ferdinand of Austria; 1609–1641	John-Charles of Austria; 1605–1619	Ferdinand III; HRE; 1608–1657	Leopold Wilhelm of Austria; 1614–1662	Ferdinand Charles; Archduke of Austria; 1628–1662	Sigismund Francis; Archduke of Austria; 1630–1665
Balthasar Charles; Prince of Asturias; 1629–1646	Charles II of Spain; 1661–1700	Ferdinand IV; King of the Romans; 1633–1654	Leopold I HRE; 1640–1705	Charles Joseph of Austria; 1649–1664
Joseph I HRE; 1678–1711	Charles VI; HRE; 1685–1740
Lorraine
Maria Theresa; HRE; 1740–1780	Francis I HRE; 1745–1765
Habsburg-Lorraine
Joseph II; HRE; 1765–1790	Leopold II; HRE; 1790–1792
Francis II; HRE; 1792–1806

Notes:

Regnal titles
Preceded by Ferdinand III	King of Germany; 1653–1654 with Ferdinand III	Succeeded by Ferdinand III
Preceded by Ferdinand III	King of Bohemia; 1646–1654 with Ferdinand III	Succeeded by Ferdinand III
Preceded by Ferdinand III	King of Hungary and Croatia; 1647–1654 with Ferdinand III	Succeeded by Ferdinand III
Preceded by Elizabeth Lucretia	Duke of Cieszyn; 1653–1654 with Ferdinand III	Succeeded by Ferdinand III
