= William, Duke of Austria =

Duke of Austria from 1386 to 1406

William the Courteous
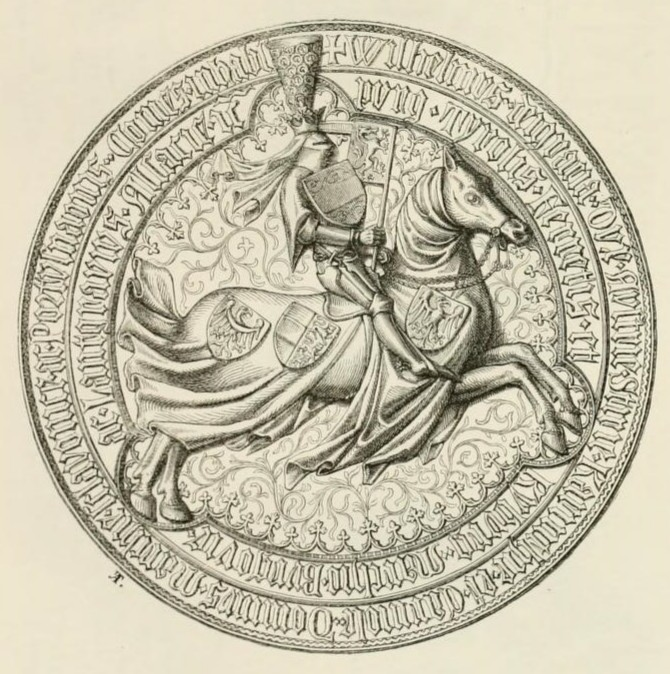
- Seal of William

Duke of Austria
- Reign: 1386–1406
- Predecessor: Leopold III
- Successor: Leopold IV
- Born: c. 1370; Vienna, Austria
- Died: 15 July 1406 (age 36); Vienna
- Burial: Ducal Crypt in St. Stephen's Cathedral, Vienna
- Spouse: Jadwiga of Poland (m. 1378; ann. 1386) Joanna of Durazzo (m. 1401)
- House: House of Habsburg
- Father: Leopold III, Duke of Austria
- Mother: Viridis Visconti

William (c. 1370 – 15 July 1406), known as William the Courteous (German: Wilhelm der Freundliche), or simply Wilhelm, was Duke of Austria from 1386. As head of the Leopoldian line, he ruled over the Inner Austrian duchies of Carinthia, Styria and Carniola as well as the County of Tyrol and Further Austria from 1396 until his death.

== Biography ==
Born in Vienna, William was the oldest son of Duke Leopold III, Duke of Austria, (1351–1386) and Viridis Visconti (1352–1414), a daughter of Lord Bernabò Visconti. Leopold III had already acted as regent over the Tyrol and the Further Austrian possessions in Swabia; in 1379 he signed the Treaty of Neuberg with his elder brother Albert III, whereupon he also received the Inner Austrian lands.

At the age of 8, William was married to Hedwig (or Jadwiga; 1374–1399), the youngest daughter of King Louis I of Hungary, who also became King of Poland in 1370. This was one of the first attempts of the Habsburgs to extend their dominions by marrying heiresses, as Louis intended his elder daughter Mary and her fiancé Sigismund of Luxembourg to succeed in Poland, while Jadwiga was designated heiress to the Kingdom of Hungary. When King Louis died in 1382, Mary succeeded in Hungary. However, Polish nobles rejected Mary and Sigismund, and instead chose Jadwiga as queen regnant. They also decided to dissolve her – still unconsummated – marriage to William.

The Polish lords did not want to accept Jadwiga's fourteen-year-old chosen husband, William of Habsburg, as their sovereign. They thought that the inexperienced William and his Austrian kinsmen could not safeguard Poland's interests against its powerful neighbours, especially the Luxembourgs which controlled Bohemia and Brandenburg, and had a strong claim to Hungary. According to Halecki, the lords of Lesser Poland were the first to suggest that Jadwiga should marry the pagan Jogaila of Lithuania.

Jogaila sent his envoys – including his brother, Skirgaila, and a German burgher from Riga, Hanul – to Kraków to request Jadwiga's hand in January 1385. Jadwiga refused to answer, stating only that her mother would be allowed decide. Jogaila's two envoys left for Hungary and met Queen Elizabeth, who informed them that "she would allow whatever was advantageous to Poland and insisted that her daughter and the prelates and nobles of the Kingdom had to do what they considered would benefit Christianity and their kingdom", according to Jan Długosz's chronicle. The nobles from Kraków, Sandomierz and Greater Poland assembled in Kraków in June or July and the "majority of the more sensible" voted for the acceptance of Jogaila's marriage proposal.

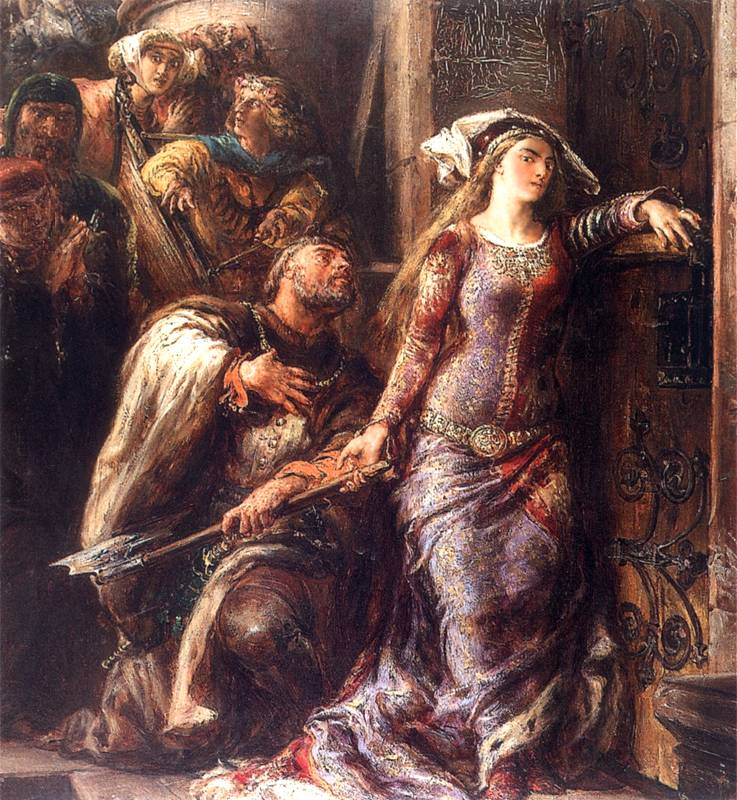
Dymitr of Goraj by Jan Matejko depicts Jadwiga trying to break the castle gate to join William

In the meantime, William's father, Leopold III, hurried to Buda in late July 1385, demanding the consummation of the marriage between William and Jadwiga occur before 16 August. Queen Elizabeth confirmed the previous agreements, ordering Vladislaus II of Opole to make preparations for the ceremony. According to canon law, Jadwiga's marriage sacrament could only be completed before her twelfth birthday if the competent prelate testified her precocious maturity. Demetrius, Archbishop of Esztergom, issued the necessary document. William traveled to Kraków in the first half of August, but his entry to Wawel Castle was barred. Długosz states that Jadwiga and William would only be able to meet in the nearby Franciscan convent.

Contemporary or nearly contemporaneous records of the completion of the marriage between William and Jadwiga are contradictory and unclear. The official accounts of the municipal authorities of Kraków record that on 23 August 1385 an amnesty was granted to the prisoners in the city jail on the occasion of the celebration of the Queen's marriage. On the other hand, a contemporary Austrian chronicle, the Continuatio Claustroneubuzgis states that the Poles had tried to murder William before he consummated the marriage. Długosz states that William was "removed in a shameful and offensive manner and driven from the castle" after he entered "the Queen's bedchamber", but the same chronicler also mentions that Jadwiga was well aware that "many people knew that ... she had for a fortnight shared her bed with Duke William and that there had been physical consummation".

On the night when William entered the queen's bedchamber, a group of Polish noblemen broke into the castle, forcing William to flee, according to Długosz. After this humiliation, Długosz continues, Jadwiga decided to leave Wawel and join William, but the gate of the castle was locked. She called for "an axe and [tried] to break it open", but Dymitr of Goraj convinced her to return to the castle. Oscar Halecki says that Długosz's narrative "cannot be dismissed as a romantic legend"; Robert I. Frost writes that it is a "tale, almost certainly apocryphal". There is no doubt, however, that William of Austria was forced to leave Poland. According to Cracow's Cathedral Calendar, before her marriage to Jogaila, the Queen had her marriage to William annulled: "(...) though Jadwiga had been, as people believed, wed by her parents in her childhood years to William, Duke of Austria, now, when she came of age, she publicly declared those nuptials, if there were any, null, and renounced them". While William claimed that his marriage to Jadwiga was consummated and lawful, Jadwiga claimed it was not. Pope Urban VI recognized the Queen's testimony that it had remained unconsummated, as well as her marriage to Jogaila as legitimate in the eyes of Catholic Church.

In 1386, Leopold III was killed at the Battle of Sempach. William and his brother Leopold IV succeeded him as Dukes of Austria, ruling jointly with their uncle Albert III. A fierce inheritance dispute arose when Albert III died in 1395 and was succeeded by his only son Albert IV, William's first cousin. An agreement was reached in the following year, based on the 1379 Treaty of Neuberg, whereupon William left rule over Austria proper to Albert IV and, as the eldest members of the Leopoldian line of the House of Habsburg, went on to rule over the three Inner Austrian duchies and the County of Tyrol, taking his residence in Graz.

In 1401, William married another presumptive heiress, Joanna of Durazzo, Hedwig's cousin, also of Angevin descent. The marriage did not produce any offspring, and William did not live to see his wife succeed her brother Ladislaus as Queen of Naples in 1414.

In 1404, William's cousin Albert IV died, leaving the lands of the elder Albertinian line to his seven-year-old son Duke Albert V. William acted as regent and again tried to take the Albertinian territories from his minor nephew, but did not succeed before his death.

William died childless in 1406 in Vienna. He is buried in the Ducal Crypt of St. Stephen's Cathedral. Upon his death, another division of the Habsburg hereditary lands took place, whereafter William's brother Leopold IV took over the regency in Austria proper, the third-born Ernest the Iron inherited the Inner Austrian duchies, and Frederick IV, the youngest, Tyrol and Further Austria.

== Male-line family tree ==
House of Habsburg

Original line
Albert; Count of Habsburg c. 1188–1239
Rudolf I of Germany c. 1218–1291
Albert I of Germany; 1255–1308	Hartmann; 1263–1281	Rudolf II; Duke of Austria; 1270–1290
Rudolf I of Bohemia; 1281–1307	Frederick the Fair c. 1289–1330	Leopold I Duke of Austria; 1290–1326	Albert II; Duke of Austria; 1298–1358	Henry the Friendly; 1299–1327	Otto; Duke of Austria; 1301–1339	John; Parricida c. 1290–1312/1313
Albertinian line	Leopoldian line
Rudolf IV; Duke of Austria; 1339–1365	Frederick III; 1347–1362	Albert III; Duke of Austria; 1349–1395	Leopold III; Duke of Austria; 1351–1386	Frederick II; Duke of Austria; 1327–1344	Leopold II; Duke of Austria; 1328–1344
Albert IV; Duke of Austria; 1377–1404	William; Duke of Austria c. 1370–1406	Leopold IV; Duke of Austria; 1371–1411	Ernest; Duke of Austria; 1377–1424	Frederick IV; Duke of Austria; 1382–1439
Albert II of Germany; 1397–1439	Frederick III; HRE; 1415–1493	Albert VI; Archduke of Austria; 1418–1463	Sigismund; Archduke of Austria; 1427–1496
Ladislaus the Posthumous; 1440–1457	Maximilian I HRE; 1459–1519
Philip I of Castile; 1478–1506
Spanish / Iberian line	Austrian / HRE line
Charles V HRE; 1500–1558	Ferdinand I HRE; 1503–1564
Philip II of Spain; 1527–1598	Maximilian II; HRE; 1527–1576	Ferdinand II; Archduke of Austria; 1529–1595	Charles II; Archduke of Austria; 1540–1590
Carlos; Prince of Asturias; 1545–1568	Philip III of Spain; 1578–1621	Rudolf II; HRE; 1552–1612	Ernest of Austria; 1553–1595	Matthias; HRE; 1557–1619	Maximilian III; Archduke of Austria; 1558–1618	Albert VII; Archduke of Austria; 1559–1621	Wenceslaus; Archduke of Austria; 1561–1578	Andrew; Margrave of Burgau; 1558–1600	Charles; Margrave of Burgau; 1560–1618	Ferdinand II; HRE; 1578–1637	Maximilian Ernest of Austria; 1583–1616	Leopold V Archduke of Austria; 1586–1632	Charles of Austria; 1590–1624
Philip IV of Spain; 1605–1665	Charles of Austria; 1607–1632	Ferdinand of Austria; 1609–1641	John-Charles of Austria; 1605–1619	Ferdinand III; HRE; 1608–1657	Leopold Wilhelm of Austria; 1614–1662	Ferdinand Charles; Archduke of Austria; 1628–1662	Sigismund Francis; Archduke of Austria; 1630–1665
Balthasar Charles; Prince of Asturias; 1629–1646	Charles II of Spain; 1661–1700	Ferdinand IV; King of the Romans; 1633–1654	Leopold I HRE; 1640–1705	Charles Joseph of Austria; 1649–1664
Joseph I HRE; 1678–1711	Charles VI; HRE; 1685–1740
Lorraine
Maria Theresa; HRE; 1740–1780	Francis I HRE; 1745–1765
Habsburg-Lorraine
Joseph II; HRE; 1765–1790	Leopold II; HRE; 1790–1792
Francis II; HRE; 1792–1806

Notes:

William, Duke of Austria House of Habsburg Born: c. 1370 Died: 15 July 1406
Regnal titles
Preceded by Leopold III	Duke of Austria; 1386–1396; With: Leopold IV	Succeeded by Albert IV
Preceded by Leopold III	Duke of Inner Austria (Styria, Carinthia, and Carniola); 1396–1406	Succeeded by Ernest
Preceded by Leopold III	Count of Tyrol; 1386–1406; With: Leopold IV	Succeeded by Frederick IV
