= Leopold I, Duke of Austria =

Duke of Austria and Styria from 1308 to 1326

Leopold I
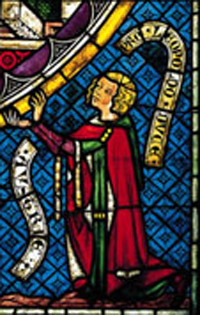
- Stained glass portrait of Leopold I of Austria, Königsfelden Monastery, Windisch, Switzerland

Duke of Austria and Styria with Frederick
- Reign: 1308–1326
- Born: c. 1290
- Died: 28 February 1326 (aged c. 35-36); Strasbourg
- Spouse: Catherine of Savoy (m. 1315)
- Issue: Catherine of Austria; Agnes of Austria
- House: Habsburg
- Father: Albert I of Germany
- Mother: Elisabeth of Gorizia-Tyrol

Leopold I (c. 1290 – 28 February 1326), called the Glorious, was Duke of Austria and Styria – as co-ruler with his elder brother Frederick the Fair – from 1308 until his death. A member of the House of Habsburg, he was the third son of Albert I of Germany and Elisabeth of Gorizia-Tyrol, a scion of the Meinhardiner dynasty.

== Biography ==
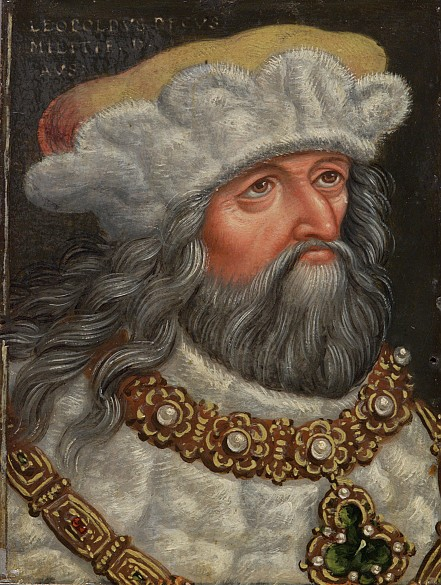
Leopold I Habsburg

After the death of his eldest brother Duke Rudolph III in 1307 and the assassination of King Albert in 1308, Leopold became administrator of Further Austria, where he started a retaliation campaign against his father's murderers. He converged with the royal House of Luxembourg and accompanied King Henry VII on his Italian campaign. In 1311, he helped to suppress a Guelph uprising in Milan under Guido della Torre, and to lay siege to the city of Brescia.

Upon Emperor Henry's death, he strongly supported his brother Frederick in the 1314 election as King of the Romans. Despite all efforts, the Habsburgs only gained the votes of four prince-electors, while Louis IV of Bavaria, with support of the Luxembourgs, was elected by five. In the following armed conflict between the rivals, the forces of Leopold were supportive of his brother's claims. In his ancestral homeland however, he incurred a decisive defeat by the Swiss Confederacy at the 1315 Battle of Morgarten.

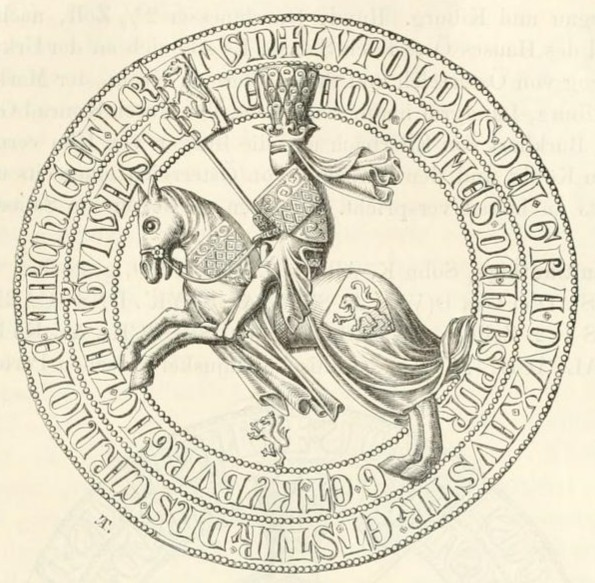
Seal of Duke Leopold of Austria

When Frederick and their younger brother Henry had been captured at the Battle of Mühldorf in 1322, Leopold struggled for their release. He entered into negotiations with King Louis IV and even surrendered the Imperial Regalia he had kept at Kyburg Castle. The parleys failed and Leopold continued to attack the Bavarian forces of Louis, who unsuccessfully laid siege to the Swabian town of Burgau in 1324. After the king had failed to reach the approval of his election by Pope John XXII and was even banned, he released Frederick in 1325. The captive however had to promise to swear his brother to acknowledge Louis as his suzerain, which Leopold refused. Frederick voluntarily returned to the Bavarian court, where he and Louis finally agreed upon a joint rule.

Leopold died in Strasbourg shortly afterwards, on 28 February 1326. His remains were buried at Königsfelden Monastery in Windisch.

== Marriage and issue ==
In 1315, Leopold married Catherine of Savoy (1284–1336), daughter of Amadeus V, Count of Savoy by his second wife, Marie of Brabant. They had two daughters:

1. Catherine of Austria (1320–1349), who married Enguerrand VI, Lord of Coucy
2. Agnes of Austria (1322–1392), who married Bolko II, Duke of Świdnica

== Male-line family tree ==
House of Habsburg

Original line
Albert; Count of Habsburg c. 1188–1239
Rudolf I of Germany c. 1218–1291
Albert I of Germany; 1255–1308	Hartmann; 1263–1281	Rudolf II; Duke of Austria; 1270–1290
Rudolf I of Bohemia; 1281–1307	Frederick the Fair c. 1289–1330	Leopold I Duke of Austria; 1290–1326	Albert II; Duke of Austria; 1298–1358	Henry the Friendly; 1299–1327	Otto; Duke of Austria; 1301–1339	John; Parricida c. 1290–1312/1313
Albertinian line	Leopoldian line
Rudolf IV; Duke of Austria; 1339–1365	Frederick III; 1347–1362	Albert III; Duke of Austria; 1349–1395	Leopold III; Duke of Austria; 1351–1386	Frederick II; Duke of Austria; 1327–1344	Leopold II; Duke of Austria; 1328–1344
Albert IV; Duke of Austria; 1377–1404	William; Duke of Austria c. 1370–1406	Leopold IV; Duke of Austria; 1371–1411	Ernest; Duke of Austria; 1377–1424	Frederick IV; Duke of Austria; 1382–1439
Albert II of Germany; 1397–1439	Frederick III; HRE; 1415–1493	Albert VI; Archduke of Austria; 1418–1463	Sigismund; Archduke of Austria; 1427–1496
Ladislaus the Posthumous; 1440–1457	Maximilian I HRE; 1459–1519
Philip I of Castile; 1478–1506
Spanish / Iberian line	Austrian / HRE line
Charles V HRE; 1500–1558	Ferdinand I HRE; 1503–1564
Philip II of Spain; 1527–1598	Maximilian II; HRE; 1527–1576	Ferdinand II; Archduke of Austria; 1529–1595	Charles II; Archduke of Austria; 1540–1590
Carlos; Prince of Asturias; 1545–1568	Philip III of Spain; 1578–1621	Rudolf II; HRE; 1552–1612	Ernest of Austria; 1553–1595	Matthias; HRE; 1557–1619	Maximilian III; Archduke of Austria; 1558–1618	Albert VII; Archduke of Austria; 1559–1621	Wenceslaus; Archduke of Austria; 1561–1578	Andrew; Margrave of Burgau; 1558–1600	Charles; Margrave of Burgau; 1560–1618	Ferdinand II; HRE; 1578–1637	Maximilian Ernest of Austria; 1583–1616	Leopold V Archduke of Austria; 1586–1632	Charles of Austria; 1590–1624
Philip IV of Spain; 1605–1665	Charles of Austria; 1607–1632	Ferdinand of Austria; 1609–1641	John-Charles of Austria; 1605–1619	Ferdinand III; HRE; 1608–1657	Leopold Wilhelm of Austria; 1614–1662	Ferdinand Charles; Archduke of Austria; 1628–1662	Sigismund Francis; Archduke of Austria; 1630–1665
Balthasar Charles; Prince of Asturias; 1629–1646	Charles II of Spain; 1661–1700	Ferdinand IV; King of the Romans; 1633–1654	Leopold I HRE; 1640–1705	Charles Joseph of Austria; 1649–1664
Joseph I HRE; 1678–1711	Charles VI; HRE; 1685–1740
Lorraine
Maria Theresa; HRE; 1740–1780	Francis I HRE; 1745–1765
Habsburg-Lorraine
Joseph II; HRE; 1765–1790	Leopold II; HRE; 1790–1792
Francis II; HRE; 1792–1806

== Bibliography ==
- Wurzbach, Constantin von (1860). "Habsburg, Leopold I. der Glorreiche". In Biographisches Lexikon des Kaiserthums Oesterreich. 6. Vienna: Kaiserlich-königliche Hof- und Staatsdruckerei, p. 409.
- ——— (1860). "Habsburg, Elisabeth von Savoyen". In Biographisches Lexikon des Kaiserthums Oesterreich. 6. Vienna: Kaiserlich-königliche Hof- und Staatsdruckerei, p. 165.
- Wheatcroft, Andrew (1996). The Habsburgs: Embodying Empire. Penguin Publishing Group. ISBN 978-0140236347.297

Leopold I, Duke of Austria House of Habsburg Born: 1290 Died: 1326
Regnal titles
Preceded by Albert I Rudolf II; Rudolf III	Duke of Austria and Styria; 1308–1326; With: Frederick the Fair	Succeeded by Frederick the Fair as sole duke
