= Leopold IV, Duke of Austria =

Austrian Habsburg ruler (1371–1411)

Leopold IV
- Duke of Austria
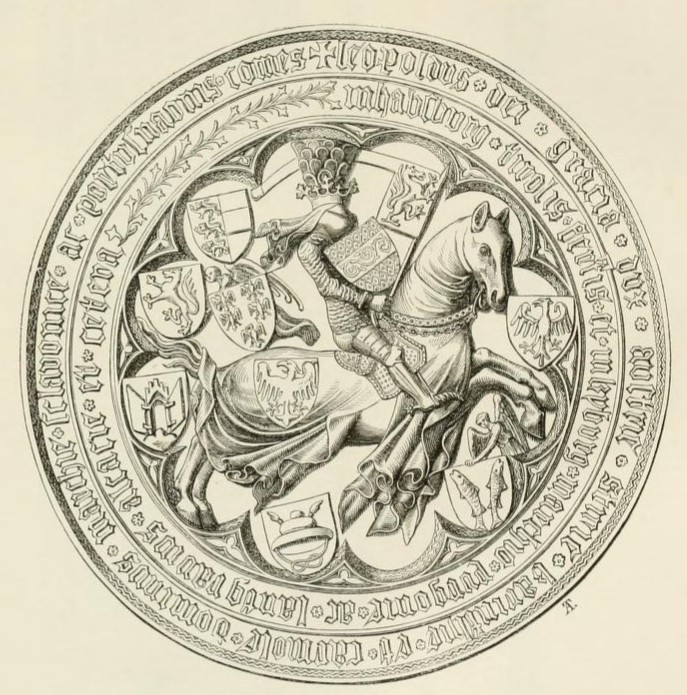
- Seal of Leopold IV
- Born: 1371
- Died: 3 June 1411 (aged 39–40); Vienna
- Burial: Ducal Crypt in the Stephansdom in Vienna
- Spouse: Catherine of Burgundy
- House: House of Habsburg
- Father: Leopold III, Duke of Austria
- Mother: Viridis Visconti

Leopold IV of Austria (1371 – 3 June 1411), known as the Fat, was Duke of Austria, jointly with his brother William the Courteous until 1406, from 1386 to 1411.

== Biography ==
Leopold was the second son of Leopold III. His eldest brother, William of Inner Austria, created the younger Leopold effective co-ruler, putting him in charge of Further Austria, which also included lands in Aargau. Leopold faced Swiss opposition to Austrian administration. From 1391 onwards, he was effective ruler of Further Austria, and from 1396 to 1406 he was also ruler in Tyrol.

Leopold married Catherine of Burgundy, daughter of Philip II, Duke of Burgundy, in 1393. She died in 1425, and they had no surviving children.

His younger brothers, Ernest and Frederick, were initiated with ducal positions in 1402. In 1406 their eldest brother William died without heirs, and Leopold became the next head of their family. Leopold had no sons either. The younger brothers made an agreement how to divide the patrimony in the future: Ernest was to receive Inner Austria and Styria, and Frederick Further Austria, including Tyrol. Leopold was left with responsibility of the Further Austrian territories, together with the position of head of the family.

In 1406, Leopold took over the guardianship of their young cousin Albert V, which resulted in conflicts with his brother Ernest. Leopold died on 3 June 1411 in Vienna and was buried in the Ducal Crypt in the city's cathedral.

== Male-line family tree ==
House of Habsburg

Original line
Albert; Count of Habsburg c. 1188–1239
Rudolf I of Germany c. 1218–1291
Albert I of Germany; 1255–1308	Hartmann; 1263–1281	Rudolf II; Duke of Austria; 1270–1290
Rudolf I of Bohemia; 1281–1307	Frederick the Fair c. 1289–1330	Leopold I Duke of Austria; 1290–1326	Albert II; Duke of Austria; 1298–1358	Henry the Friendly; 1299–1327	Otto; Duke of Austria; 1301–1339	John; Parricida c. 1290–1312/1313
Albertinian line	Leopoldian line
Rudolf IV; Duke of Austria; 1339–1365	Frederick III; 1347–1362	Albert III; Duke of Austria; 1349–1395	Leopold III; Duke of Austria; 1351–1386	Frederick II; Duke of Austria; 1327–1344	Leopold II; Duke of Austria; 1328–1344
Albert IV; Duke of Austria; 1377–1404	William; Duke of Austria c. 1370–1406	Leopold IV; Duke of Austria; 1371–1411	Ernest; Duke of Austria; 1377–1424	Frederick IV; Duke of Austria; 1382–1439
Albert II of Germany; 1397–1439	Frederick III; HRE; 1415–1493	Albert VI; Archduke of Austria; 1418–1463	Sigismund; Archduke of Austria; 1427–1496
Ladislaus the Posthumous; 1440–1457	Maximilian I HRE; 1459–1519
Philip I of Castile; 1478–1506
Spanish / Iberian line	Austrian / HRE line
Charles V HRE; 1500–1558	Ferdinand I HRE; 1503–1564
Philip II of Spain; 1527–1598	Maximilian II; HRE; 1527–1576	Ferdinand II; Archduke of Austria; 1529–1595	Charles II; Archduke of Austria; 1540–1590
Carlos; Prince of Asturias; 1545–1568	Philip III of Spain; 1578–1621	Rudolf II; HRE; 1552–1612	Ernest of Austria; 1553–1595	Matthias; HRE; 1557–1619	Maximilian III; Archduke of Austria; 1558–1618	Albert VII; Archduke of Austria; 1559–1621	Wenceslaus; Archduke of Austria; 1561–1578	Andrew; Margrave of Burgau; 1558–1600	Charles; Margrave of Burgau; 1560–1618	Ferdinand II; HRE; 1578–1637	Maximilian Ernest of Austria; 1583–1616	Leopold V Archduke of Austria; 1586–1632	Charles of Austria; 1590–1624
Philip IV of Spain; 1605–1665	Charles of Austria; 1607–1632	Ferdinand of Austria; 1609–1641	John-Charles of Austria; 1605–1619	Ferdinand III; HRE; 1608–1657	Leopold Wilhelm of Austria; 1614–1662	Ferdinand Charles; Archduke of Austria; 1628–1662	Sigismund Francis; Archduke of Austria; 1630–1665
Balthasar Charles; Prince of Asturias; 1629–1646	Charles II of Spain; 1661–1700	Ferdinand IV; King of the Romans; 1633–1654	Leopold I HRE; 1640–1705	Charles Joseph of Austria; 1649–1664
Joseph I HRE; 1678–1711	Charles VI; HRE; 1685–1740
Lorraine
Maria Theresa; HRE; 1740–1780	Francis I HRE; 1745–1765
Habsburg-Lorraine
Joseph II; HRE; 1765–1790	Leopold II; HRE; 1790–1792
Francis II; HRE; 1792–1806

Notes:

Leopold IV, Duke of Austria House of Habsburg Born: 1371 Died: 3 June 1411
Preceded by Leopold III	Duke of Further Austria; 1386–1411 jointly with William until 1406	Succeeded by Frederick IV
