= Ernest, Duke of Austria =

Ernest I
- Duke of Austria
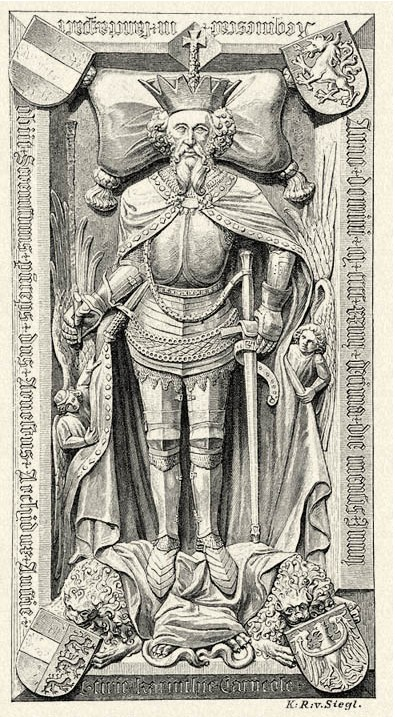
- Drawing of Ernest's tomb, 1891

Duke of Styria, Carinthia and Carniola
- Reign: 15 July 1406 – 10 June 1424
- Predecessor: William
- Successor: Frederick V and Albert VI
- Born: 1377; Bruck an der Mur, Duchy of Styria
- Died: 10 June 1424 (aged 46–47); Bruck an der Mur, Duchy of Styria
- Spouse: Margarethe of Pomerania (m. 1392; died 1407) Cymburgis of Masovia (m. 1412)
- Issue Detail: Frederick III, Holy Roman Emperor; Margaret, Electress of Saxony; Albert VI of Austria; Catherine, Margravine of Baden-Baden
- House: Habsburg
- Father: Leopold III, Duke of Austria
- Mother: Viridis Visconti

Ernest the Iron-Willed (German: Ernst der Eiserne; 1377 – 10 June 1424), a member of the House of Habsburg, ruled over the Inner Austrian duchies of Styria, Carinthia and Carniola from 1406 until his death. He was head of the Habsburg Leopoldian line from 1411.

== Biography ==
Ernest was born in Bruck an der Mur in Styria, the third son of Duke Leopold III of Austria (1351–1386) and his consort Viridis Visconti (d. 1414), a daughter of Bernabò Visconti, Lord of Milan. Shortly after his birth, his father and his uncle Albert III divided the Habsburg lands by the 1379 Treaty of Neuberg: while Albert and his Albertinian descendants would rule over the Duchy of Austria proper, the Leopoldian line received the Inner Austrian states of Styria, Carinthia and Carniola with the remaining March of Istria, as well as Tyrol and the Further Austrian possessions. After Leopold's death in the 1386 Battle of Sempach, young Ernest and his brothers William, Leopold IV and Frederick IV remained under the guardianship of their uncle Albert III.

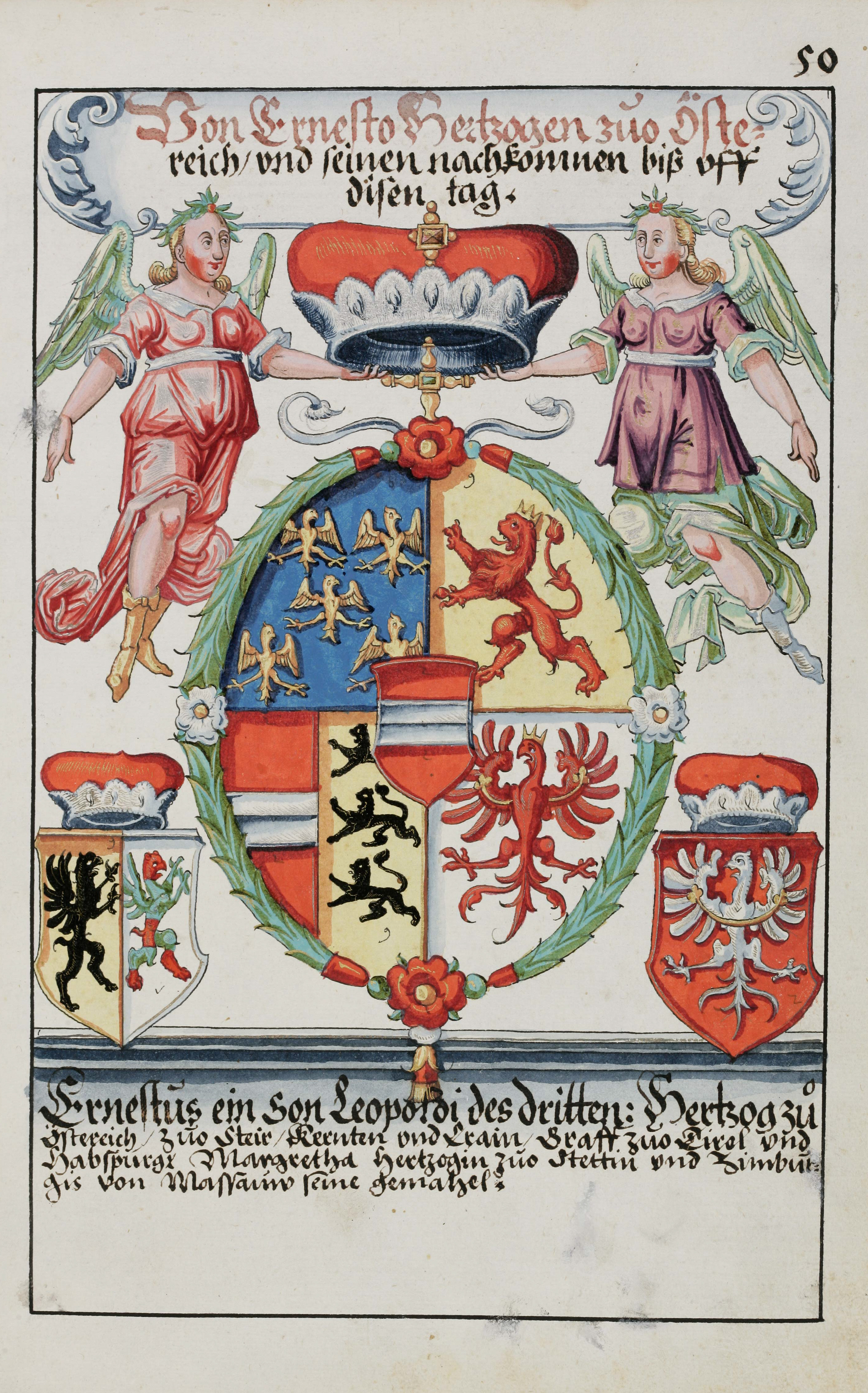
Coat of arms of Duke Ernest of Austria (1627)

In 1401 Ernest accompanied King Rupert of Germany on his campaign to Italy. When their elder brother William died in 1406, the remaining three sons of Leopold III agreed about the partition of their patrimony: In the separation agreement of 1406, Ernest received Styria, Carinthia and Carniola, and jointly with his elder brother Leopold IV (the current head of the Leopoldian line) held the guardianship over their minor nephew Albert V of Austria, grandson of Duke Albert III. Tyrol and Further Austria passed to the youngest brother Frederick IV.

In 1407, however, conflicts between Leopold and Ernest resulted in a civil war that lasted until May 1409. When Leopold died without male heirs in 1411, Ernest finally became the uncontested head of the Leopoldian branch. In 1414, he became the last Duke to be enthroned according to Carantanian traditional rite at the Prince's Stone in Carinthia, and from that time on called himself 'archduke'. He was the first Habsburg to actually use this title, which had been invented by his uncle Duke Rudolf IV.

Ernest was made a member of the Order of the Dragon and of the Equestrian Order of the Holy Sepulchre of Jerusalem in 1414, however, he became bitter with the Luxembourg king Sigismund from 1412 onwards. When his brother Frederick IV, a supporter of Antipope John XXIII at the Council of Constance, was banned by the king in 1417, Ernest first attempted to gain control over Frederick's territories himself, but then came to an agreement with him and successfully defended Tyrol against Sigismund's pretensions. Ernest turned out to be a capable ruler of the Inner Austrian lands; his eldest son Frederick V would become sole heir of all Habsburg lines, elected King of the Romans in 1440 and crowned Holy Roman Emperor in 1452.

Ernest died at Bruck an der Mur, and was buried in the Cistercian monastery of Rein near Graz. His nickname the Iron only came into use after his death.

== Family and children ==
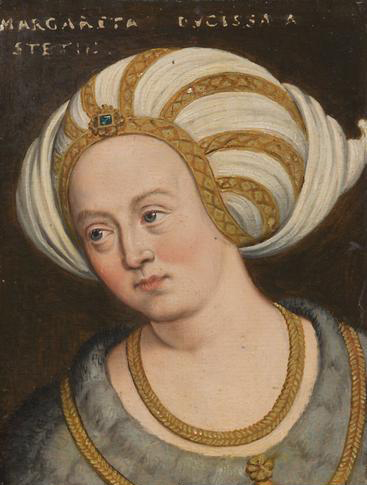
Margaret of Pomerania

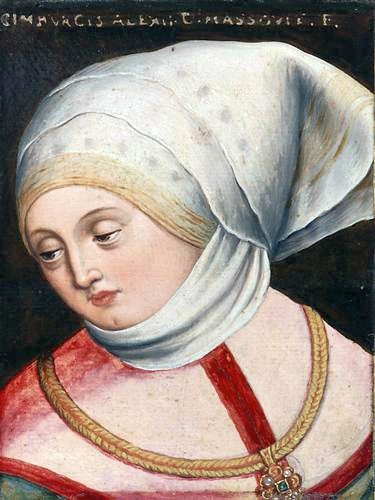
Cymburgis of Masovia

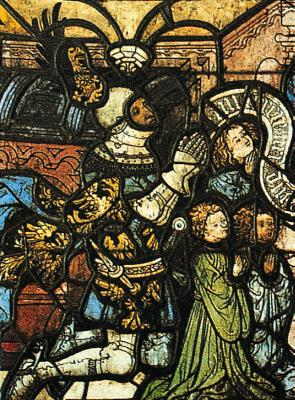
Ernest the Iron and his sons

On 14 January 1392, Ernest married his first wife, Margaret of Pomerania. She was a daughter of the Griffin duke Bogislaw V of Pomerania and Adelheid of Brunswick-Grubenhagen. They had no children. She died in either 1407 or 1410, according to contradictory necrologies.

On 25 January 1412, Ernest married the Piast princess Cymburgis of Masovia. They had:

- Frederick III, Holy Roman Emperor (21 September 1415 – 19 August 1493)
- Margaret of Austria (1416/17 – 12 February 1486), married on 3 June 1431 to Frederick II, Elector of Saxony
- Albert VI of Austria (18 December 1418 – 2 December 1463)
- Alexander of Austria (died 1420)
- Rudolf of Austria (died before 1424)
- Catherine of Austria (1420 – 11 September 1493), married on 15 July 1447 to Charles I of Baden-Baden
- Leopold of Austria (died before 1424)
- Anna of Austria (died 11 November 1429)
- Ernest of Austria (died 10 August 1432)

As the ruler of Inner Austria and founder of the older Styrian line of the Habsburgs, which, by their son, Frederick III survived the Albertinian (Austrian) and Tyrolean lines, Ernest and Cymburgis became the ancestors of all later emperors of the Habsburg monarchy.

== Male-line family tree ==
House of Habsburg

Original line
Albert; Count of Habsburg c. 1188–1239
Rudolf I of Germany c. 1218–1291
Albert I of Germany; 1255–1308	Hartmann; 1263–1281	Rudolf II; Duke of Austria; 1270–1290
Rudolf I of Bohemia; 1281–1307	Frederick the Fair c. 1289–1330	Leopold I Duke of Austria; 1290–1326	Albert II; Duke of Austria; 1298–1358	Henry the Friendly; 1299–1327	Otto; Duke of Austria; 1301–1339	John; Parricida c. 1290–1312/1313
Albertinian line	Leopoldian line
Rudolf IV; Duke of Austria; 1339–1365	Frederick III; 1347–1362	Albert III; Duke of Austria; 1349–1395	Leopold III; Duke of Austria; 1351–1386	Frederick II; Duke of Austria; 1327–1344	Leopold II; Duke of Austria; 1328–1344
Albert IV; Duke of Austria; 1377–1404	William; Duke of Austria c. 1370–1406	Leopold IV; Duke of Austria; 1371–1411	Ernest; Duke of Austria; 1377–1424	Frederick IV; Duke of Austria; 1382–1439
Albert II of Germany; 1397–1439	Frederick III; HRE; 1415–1493	Albert VI; Archduke of Austria; 1418–1463	Sigismund; Archduke of Austria; 1427–1496
Ladislaus the Posthumous; 1440–1457	Maximilian I HRE; 1459–1519
Philip I of Castile; 1478–1506
Spanish / Iberian line	Austrian / HRE line
Charles V HRE; 1500–1558	Ferdinand I HRE; 1503–1564
Philip II of Spain; 1527–1598	Maximilian II; HRE; 1527–1576	Ferdinand II; Archduke of Austria; 1529–1595	Charles II; Archduke of Austria; 1540–1590
Carlos; Prince of Asturias; 1545–1568	Philip III of Spain; 1578–1621	Rudolf II; HRE; 1552–1612	Ernest of Austria; 1553–1595	Matthias; HRE; 1557–1619	Maximilian III; Archduke of Austria; 1558–1618	Albert VII; Archduke of Austria; 1559–1621	Wenceslaus; Archduke of Austria; 1561–1578	Andrew; Margrave of Burgau; 1558–1600	Charles; Margrave of Burgau; 1560–1618	Ferdinand II; HRE; 1578–1637	Maximilian Ernest of Austria; 1583–1616	Leopold V Archduke of Austria; 1586–1632	Charles of Austria; 1590–1624
Philip IV of Spain; 1605–1665	Charles of Austria; 1607–1632	Ferdinand of Austria; 1609–1641	John-Charles of Austria; 1605–1619	Ferdinand III; HRE; 1608–1657	Leopold Wilhelm of Austria; 1614–1662	Ferdinand Charles; Archduke of Austria; 1628–1662	Sigismund Francis; Archduke of Austria; 1630–1665
Balthasar Charles; Prince of Asturias; 1629–1646	Charles II of Spain; 1661–1700	Ferdinand IV; King of the Romans; 1633–1654	Leopold I HRE; 1640–1705	Charles Joseph of Austria; 1649–1664
Joseph I HRE; 1678–1711	Charles VI; HRE; 1685–1740
Lorraine
Maria Theresa; HRE; 1740–1780	Francis I HRE; 1745–1765
Habsburg-Lorraine
Joseph II; HRE; 1765–1790	Leopold II; HRE; 1790–1792
Francis II; HRE; 1792–1806

== Sources ==
- Lodge, Eleanor Constance (1924). The End of the Middle Age, 1273-1453. Methuen & Company Limited.
- Hohkamp, Michaela (2007). "Sisters, Aunts, and Cousins: Familial Architectures and the Political Field in Early Modern Europe". In Sabean, David Warren; Mathieu, Jon; Teuscher, Simon (eds.). Kinship in Europe: Approaches to Long-Term Development (1300-1900). Berghahn Books.

Ernest, Duke of Austria House of Habsburg Born: 1377 Died: 10 June 1424
Regnal titles
Preceded by William	Duke of Styria, Carinthia and Carniola; 1406–1424	Succeeded by Frederick V & Albert VI
