= Frederick IV of Austria =

Frederick IV
- Duke of Austria
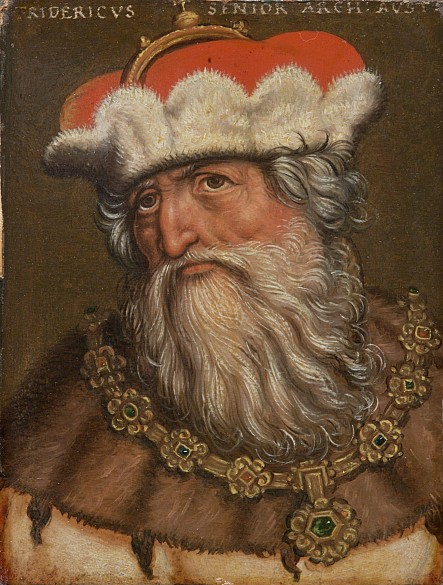
- Portrait by Anton Boys
- Born: 1382
- Died: 24 June 1439; Innsbruck, Tyrol
- Burial: Stams Abbey
- Spouse: Elisabeth of the Palatinate; Anna of Brunswick-Lüneburg
- Issue: Sigismund, Archduke of Austria
- House: House of Habsburg
- Father: Leopold III
- Mother: Viridis Visconti

Frederick IV (1382 – 24 June 1439), also known as Frederick of the Empty Pockets (German: Friedrich mit der leeren Tasche), a member of the House of Habsburg, was Duke of Austria from 1402 until his death. As a scion of the Habsburg Leopoldian line, he ruled over Further Austria and the County of Tyrol from 1406 onwards.

== Biography ==
Frederick was the youngest son of Duke Leopold III (1351–1386) and his wife Viridis (d. 1414), a daughter of Bernabò Visconti, Lord of Milan. According to the 1379 Treaty of Neuberg, his father ruled over the Habsburg Inner Austrian territories of Styria, Carinthia, Carniola, as well as over Tyrol and the dynasty's original Further Austrian possessions in Swabia. After the early death of Duke Leopold in the 1386 Battle of Sempach, Frederick and his elder brothers William, Leopold IV and Ernest initially remained under the tutelage of their uncle Duke Albert III of Austria.

As an inheritance dispute arose upon Duke Albert's death in 1395, the young Leopoldian dukes insisted on their rights: the next year, William went on to rule the Inner Austrian lands and Leopold IV ascended as Count of Tyrol. When Frederick came of age in 1402, he was formally assigned to administer his father's inheritance in the scattered Habsburg territories in Swabia, referred to collectively as Further Austria (Vorderösterreich) and took his residence in Freiburg im Breisgau. Another division of the Leopoldian territories took place after William' death in 1406: Duke Leopold IV, now eldest heir, ceded Tyrol to Frederick; however, he did not become sole ruler in Further Austria until Leopold's death in 1411.

The early years of Frederick's reign were marked by external and internal conflicts. He had to overcome the opposition of Tyrolean nobles (who gave him the title "of the Empty Pockets") in 1406/1407 and a rebellion in the Bishopric of Trent. He also had to deal with the independence movement in the Swabian Appenzell lands, where the conflict with the Prince-Abbots of St Gall had escalated in 1401, sparking the Appenzell Wars. Frederick had to withstand in a series of longstanding military conflicts, until a peace was concluded in 1410. However, the Appenzell area became a protectorate of the Old Swiss Confederacy in 1411. Back in Tyrol, he had to face the invading forces of Duke Stephen III of Bavaria, whom he defeated in the Lower Inn Valley.

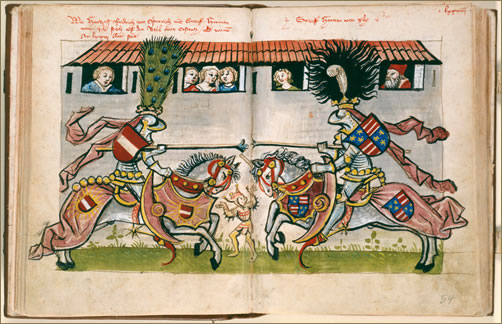
Council of Constance: tournament of Frederick IV of Austria and Frederick II of Celje, depiction in the chronicles by Ulrich of Richenthal (c. 1470)

Upon the death of Duke Leopold IV in 1411, the surviving younger brothers Frederick and Ernest again divided the Leopoldian possessions. With Further Austria, Frederick became undisputed ruler over the Habsburg territories in the Alsace region and of the Burgau margraviate. In 1417 he also inherited the former Kyburg estates from the extinct comital Habsburg-Laufenburg branch. Several border conflicts with the Republic of Venice led to the loss of Rovereto in the Lagarina Valley.

Under the terms of the Western Schism, Duke Frederick sided with Antipope John XXIII, whom he helped on his flight from the Council of Constance in March 1415. The Luxembourg king Sigismund had John arrested in Breisgau and placed Frederick under the Imperial ban. Thanks to the support of the local populace he managed to keep Tyrol, though he lost the western Aargau, the Freiamt and County of Baden estates, in the old homeland of the Habsburgs, to the Swiss.

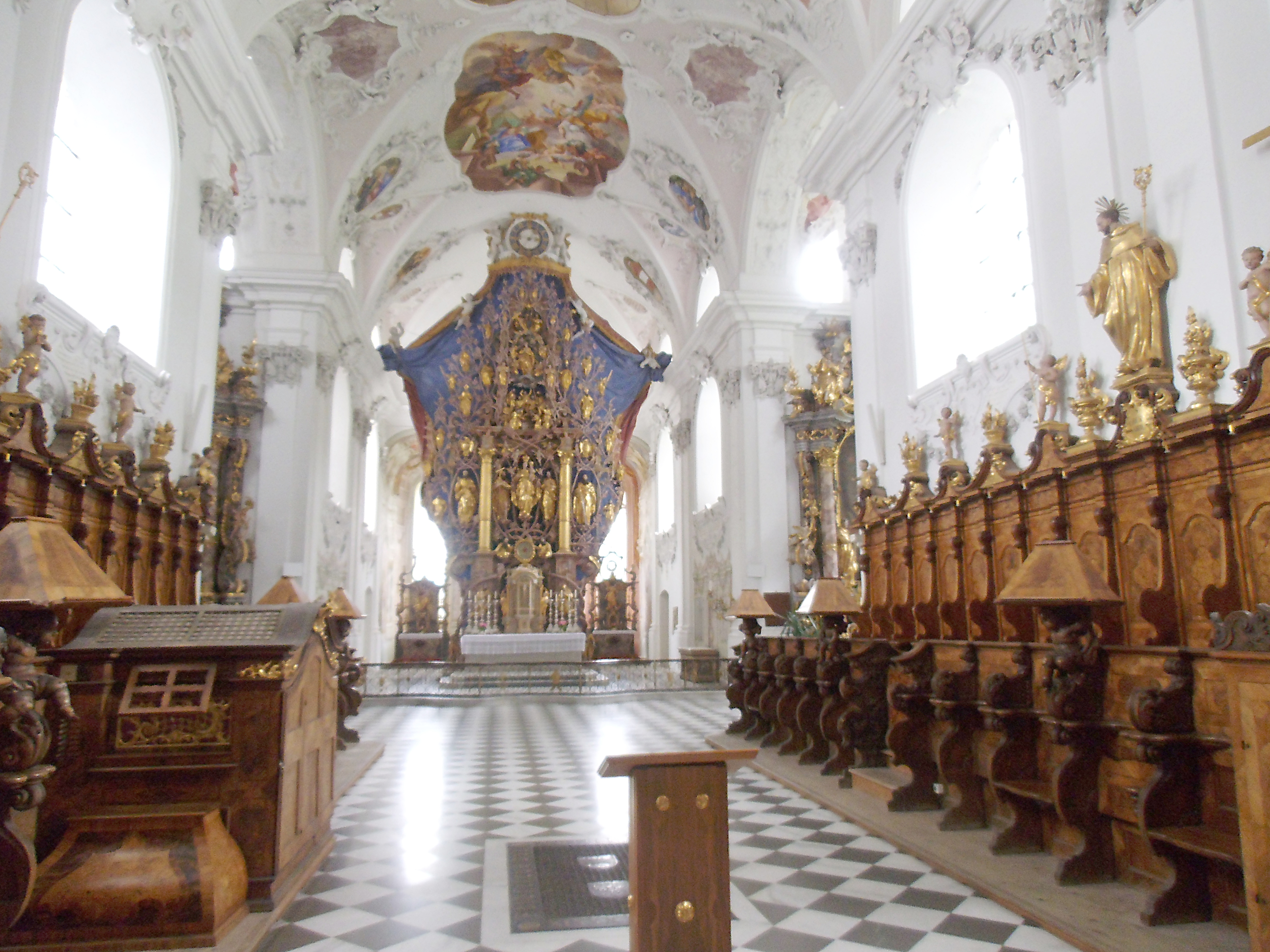
Stams Abbey Church

In 1420, Frederick also moved his Tyrolean court from Meran to Innsbruck. After several rebellions by local nobles, his rule over Tyrol had stabilized, partially due to the successful beginning of silver mining that brought an increase in prosperity to the region. After the death of his brother Ernest on 10 June 1424, Duke Frederick also took over the regency over Inner Austria for his minor nephews Frederick V (the later Emperor Frederick III) and Albert VI. In his later years, however, he again had to cope with another rebellion against his Tyrolean rule, instigated by Prince-Bishop Alexander of Trent.

Frederick died at his court in Innsbruck, despite his nickname, a rich man. His son and heir Sigismund was called der Münzreiche ("Rich in Coin"). Frederick was buried in the Cistercian abbey of Stams, Tyrol.

== Marriage and issue ==
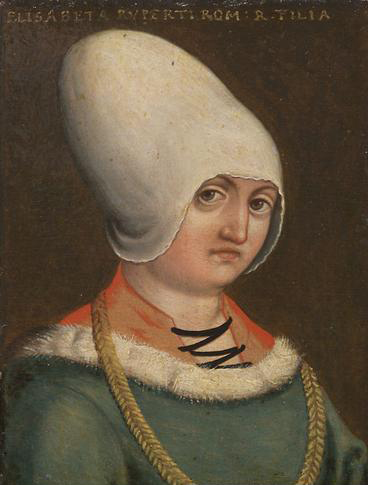
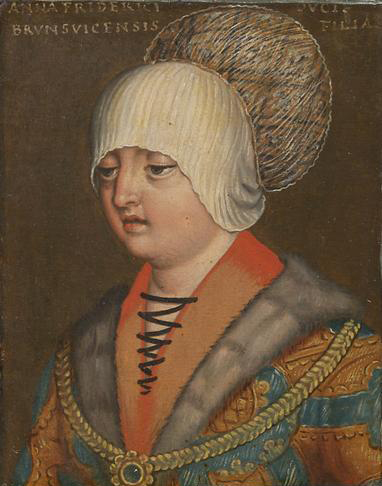
(left) Elisabeth of the Palatinate (right) Anna of Brunswick-Luneburg

On 24 December 1407, Frederick married Elizabeth of the Palatinate (1381–1408), daughter of King Rupert of Germany, in Innsbruck. They had one daughter, Elizabeth, but both mother and child died shortly after the birth on 27 December 1408.

On 11 June 1411, Frederick married Anna (d. 1432), daughter of the Welf duke Frederick I of Brunswick-Wolfenbüttel; they had:

- Margaret (1423 – 1424)
- Hedwig (1424 – 1427)
- Wolfgang (1426)
- Sigismund (1427 – 1496).

Only Sigismund survived until adulthood. He succeeded his father in Tyrol and Further Austria.

== Male-line family tree ==
House of Habsburg

Original line
Albert; Count of Habsburg c. 1188–1239
Rudolf I of Germany c. 1218–1291
Albert I of Germany; 1255–1308 | Hartmann; 1263–1281 | Rudolf II; Duke of Austria; 1270–1290
Rudolf I of Bohemia; 1281–1307 | Frederick the Fair c. 1289–1330 | Leopold I Duke of Austria; 1290–1326 | Albert II; Duke of Austria; 1298–1358 | Henry the Friendly; 1299–1327 | Otto; Duke of Austria; 1301–1339 | John; Parricida c. 1290–1312/1313
Albertinian line | Leopoldian line
Rudolf IV; Duke of Austria; 1339–1365 | Frederick III; 1347–1362 | Albert III; Duke of Austria; 1349–1395 | Leopold III; Duke of Austria; 1351–1386 | Frederick II; Duke of Austria; 1327–1344 | Leopold II; Duke of Austria; 1328–1344
Albert IV; Duke of Austria; 1377–1404 | William; Duke of Austria c. 1370–1406 | Leopold IV; Duke of Austria; 1371–1411 | Ernest; Duke of Austria; 1377–1424 | Frederick IV; Duke of Austria; 1382–1439
Albert II of Germany; 1397–1439 | Frederick III; HRE; 1415–1493 | Albert VI; Archduke of Austria; 1418–1463 | Sigismund; Archduke of Austria; 1427–1496
Ladislaus the Posthumous; 1440–1457 | Maximilian I HRE; 1459–1519
Philip I of Castile; 1478–1506
Spanish / Iberian line | Austrian / HRE line
Charles V HRE; 1500–1558 | Ferdinand I HRE; 1503–1564
Philip II of Spain; 1527–1598 | Maximilian II; HRE; 1527–1576 | Ferdinand II; Archduke of Austria; 1529–1595 | Charles II; Archduke of Austria; 1540–1590
Carlos; Prince of Asturias; 1545–1568 | Philip III of Spain; 1578–1621 | Rudolf II; HRE; 1552–1612 | Ernest of Austria; 1553–1595 | Matthias; HRE; 1557–1619 | Maximilian III; Archduke of Austria; 1558–1618 | Albert VII; Archduke of Austria; 1559–1621 | Wenceslaus; Archduke of Austria; 1561–1578 | Andrew; Margrave of Burgau; 1558–1600 | Charles; Margrave of Burgau; 1560–1618 | Ferdinand II; HRE; 1578–1637 | Maximilian Ernest of Austria; 1583–1616 | Leopold V Archduke of Austria; 1586–1632 | Charles of Austria; 1590–1624
Philip IV of Spain; 1605–1665 | Charles of Austria; 1607–1632 | Ferdinand of Austria; 1609–1641 | John-Charles of Austria; 1605–1619 | Ferdinand III; HRE; 1608–1657 | Leopold Wilhelm of Austria; 1614–1662 | Ferdinand Charles; Archduke of Austria; 1628–1662 | Sigismund Francis; Archduke of Austria; 1630–1665
Balthasar Charles; Prince of Asturias; 1629–1646 | Charles II of Spain; 1661–1700 | Ferdinand IV; King of the Romans; 1633–1654 | Leopold I HRE; 1640–1705 | Charles Joseph of Austria; 1649–1664
Joseph I HRE; 1678–1711 | Charles VI; HRE; 1685–1740
Lorraine
Maria Theresa; HRE; 1740–1780 | Francis I HRE; 1745–1765
Habsburg-Lorraine
Joseph II; HRE; 1765–1790 | Leopold II; HRE; 1790–1792
Francis II; HRE; 1792–1806

== Sources ==
- Berenger, Jean (2013). A History of the Habsburg Empire 1273–1700. Translated by Simpson, C.A. Routledge.
- Wilson, Peter (2016). Heart of Europe: A History of the Holy Roman Empire. Harvard University Press.

Frederick IV of Austria House of Habsburg Born: 1382 Died: June 24 1439
| Preceded by Leopold IV | Duke of Further Austria; 1402–1439 | Succeeded by Sigismund |
| Preceded by William | Count of Tyrol; 1406–1439 | Succeeded by Sigismund |
