= Catherine of Burgundy =

French noblewoman (1378–1425)

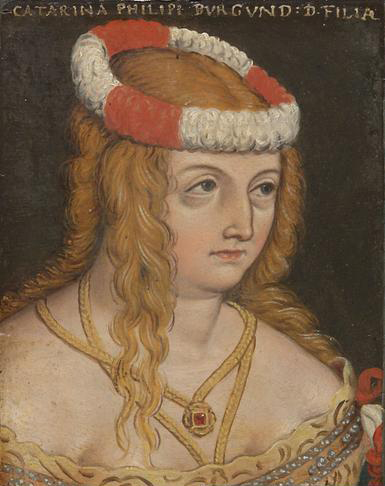
Posthumous portrait of Catherine by Anton Boys

Catharine of Burgundy (Montbard, 1378 – Dijon, 26 January 1425) was Duchess of Further Austria by marriage to Leopold IV, Duke of Austria.

She was the second daughter of Philip the Bold, Duke of Burgundy, and Margaret III, Countess of Flanders.

She was married on 15 August 1393 with Leopold IV, Duke of Austria, gaining the county of Ferrette for her dowry. Following Leopold's death in 1411, his brother Frederick occupied the county of Ferrette despite Catherine and her nephew Duke Philip of Burgundy's negotiations. She lived mainly in her residence in the Alsace, close to her native Burgundy. The marriage remained childless.

Around 1415, she remarried with Maximilian Smassmann von Rappoltstein. This marriage also remained childless and they divorced in 1421. She was buried in the Chartreuse de Champmol.

== Sources ==
- Hardy, Duncan (2017). "Burgundian clients in the south-western Holy Roman Empire, 1410-1477: Between international diplomacy and regional political culture". In Hennings, Jan; Sowerby, Tracey A. (eds.). Practices of Diplomacy in the Early Modern World C.1410-1800. Taylor & Francis. pp. 25–43. ISBN 9781351736916.
- Vaughan, Richard (2002a). Philip the Bold: The Formation of the Burgundian state. The Boydell Press. ISBN 978-0-85115-915-7.
- Vaughan, Richard (2002). Philip the Good: The Apogee of Burgundy. The Boydell Press. ISBN 0 85115 917 6.
