= Albert IV of Austria =

Duke of Austria from 1395 to 1404

Albert IV
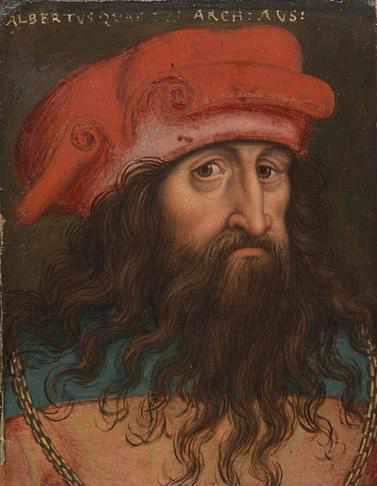
- Posthumous portrait by Anton Boys

Duke of Austria
- Reign: 1395–1404
- Predecessor: Albert III the Pigtail
- Successor: Albert V
- Born: 19 September 1377; Vienna
- Died: 14 September 1404 (aged 26); Klosterneuburg
- Spouse: Joanna Sophia of Bavaria (m. 1390)
- Issue: Margarete; Albert II of Germany
- House: House of Habsburg
- Father: Albert III of Austria
- Mother: Beatrix of Nuremberg

Albert IV of Austria (sometimes known as Albert the Peculiar; 19 September 1377 – 14 September 1404) was a Duke of Austria.

== Biography ==
He was born in Vienna, the son of Albert III of Austria and Beatrix of Nuremberg. He was the Duke of Austria from 1395 until 1404, which then included roughly today's Lower Austria and most of Upper Austria, as the other Habsburg dominions were at that time ruled by his relatives of the Leopoldinian Line of the family. Albert's rule was characterized by quarrels with that part of his family and with members of the Luxemburg dynasty, Wenceslaus and Sigismund.

Albert died at Klosterneuburg, Lower Austria, in 1404. He is buried in the Ducal Crypt in the Stephansdom in Vienna. He was succeeded by his son Albert. Through his maternal grandmother, Elisabeth of Meissen, Albert IV descended from Babenberg dukes of Austria.

== Family and children ==
He was married in Vienna 24 April 1390 to Joanna Sophia of Bavaria, daughter of Albrecht I, Duke of Bavaria-Straubing and Margarete of Brieg. Their children were:

1. Margarete (26 June 1395, Vienna–24 December 1447), married in Landshut 25 November 1412 to Duke Henry XVI of Bavaria.
2. Albert V (16 August 1397–27 October 1439, Neszmély, Hungary).

== Male-line family tree ==
House of Habsburg

Original line
Albert; Count of Habsburg c. 1188–1239
Rudolf I of Germany c. 1218–1291
Albert I of Germany; 1255–1308	Hartmann; 1263–1281	Rudolf II; Duke of Austria; 1270–1290
Rudolf I of Bohemia; 1281–1307	Frederick the Fair c. 1289–1330	Leopold I Duke of Austria; 1290–1326	Albert II; Duke of Austria; 1298–1358	Henry the Friendly; 1299–1327	Otto; Duke of Austria; 1301–1339	John; Parricida c. 1290–1312/1313
Albertinian line	Leopoldian line
Rudolf IV; Duke of Austria; 1339–1365	Frederick III; 1347–1362	Albert III; Duke of Austria; 1349–1395	Leopold III; Duke of Austria; 1351–1386	Frederick II; Duke of Austria; 1327–1344	Leopold II; Duke of Austria; 1328–1344
Albert IV; Duke of Austria; 1377–1404	William; Duke of Austria c. 1370–1406	Leopold IV; Duke of Austria; 1371–1411	Ernest; Duke of Austria; 1377–1424	Frederick IV; Duke of Austria; 1382–1439
Albert II of Germany; 1397–1439	Frederick III; HRE; 1415–1493	Albert VI; Archduke of Austria; 1418–1463	Sigismund; Archduke of Austria; 1427–1496
Ladislaus the Posthumous; 1440–1457	Maximilian I HRE; 1459–1519
Philip I of Castile; 1478–1506
Spanish / Iberian line	Austrian / HRE line
Charles V HRE; 1500–1558	Ferdinand I HRE; 1503–1564
Philip II of Spain; 1527–1598	Maximilian II; HRE; 1527–1576	Ferdinand II; Archduke of Austria; 1529–1595	Charles II; Archduke of Austria; 1540–1590
Carlos; Prince of Asturias; 1545–1568	Philip III of Spain; 1578–1621	Rudolf II; HRE; 1552–1612	Ernest of Austria; 1553–1595	Matthias; HRE; 1557–1619	Maximilian III; Archduke of Austria; 1558–1618	Albert VII; Archduke of Austria; 1559–1621	Wenceslaus; Archduke of Austria; 1561–1578	Andrew; Margrave of Burgau; 1558–1600	Charles; Margrave of Burgau; 1560–1618	Ferdinand II; HRE; 1578–1637	Maximilian Ernest of Austria; 1583–1616	Leopold V Archduke of Austria; 1586–1632	Charles of Austria; 1590–1624
Philip IV of Spain; 1605–1665	Charles of Austria; 1607–1632	Ferdinand of Austria; 1609–1641	John-Charles of Austria; 1605–1619	Ferdinand III; HRE; 1608–1657	Leopold Wilhelm of Austria; 1614–1662	Ferdinand Charles; Archduke of Austria; 1628–1662	Sigismund Francis; Archduke of Austria; 1630–1665
Balthasar Charles; Prince of Asturias; 1629–1646	Charles II of Spain; 1661–1700	Ferdinand IV; King of the Romans; 1633–1654	Leopold I HRE; 1640–1705	Charles Joseph of Austria; 1649–1664
Joseph I HRE; 1678–1711	Charles VI; HRE; 1685–1740
Lorraine
Maria Theresa; HRE; 1740–1780	Francis I HRE; 1745–1765
Habsburg-Lorraine
Joseph II; HRE; 1765–1790	Leopold II; HRE; 1790–1792
Francis II; HRE; 1792–1806

== Sources ==
- Previte-Orton, C.W. (1952). The Shorter Cambridge Medieval History: The Twelfth Century to the Renaissance. Vol. 2. Cambridge University Press.

Albert IV of Austria House of Habsburg Born: 19 September 1377 Died: 14 September 1404
Regnal titles
Preceded by Albert III	Duke of Austria; 1395–1404	Succeeded by Albert V
