= Albert III of Austria =

Duke of Austria from 1365 to 1395

Albert III
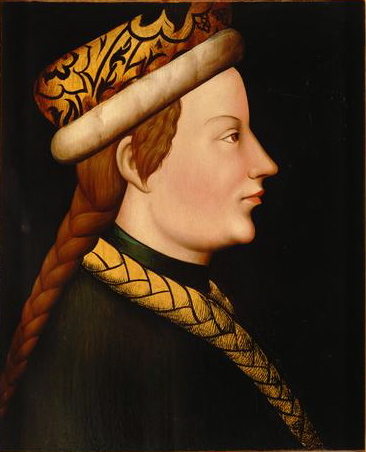
- Anonymous 16th-century portrait

Duke of Austria
- Reign: 1365–1395
- Predecessor: Rudolf IV the Founder
- Successor: Albert IV the Patient
- Born: 9 September 1349; Vienna, Austria
- Died: 29 August 1395 (aged 45); Laxenburg Castle, Austria
- Burial: St. Stephen's Cathedral, Vienna
- Spouses: Elisabeth of Bohemia; Beatrice of Nuremberg
- Issue: Albert IV, Duke of Austria
- House: House of Habsburg
- Father: Albert II of Austria
- Mother: Joanna of Pfirt

Albert III of Austria (9 September 1349 – 29 August 1395), known as Albert with the Braid (Pigtail) (German: Albrecht mit dem Zopf), a member of the House of Habsburg, was Duke of Austria from 1365 until his death.

== Biography ==
Albert III was born in the ducal residence of Vienna, the third son of the Habsburg duke Albert II of Austria and his wife Joanna of Pfirt. Even though his father had determined a house law, whereby the four sons were obliged to rule jointly and equally, the eldest brother Rudolf IV assumed the reins of government after his father's death in 1358. He reaffirmed his supremacy issuing the Privilegium Maius. However, as his marriage remained childless he again had to share his power with his younger brothers. In 1365 Rudolf IV, Albert III, and Leopold III together signed the foundation certificate of the Vienna University (Alma Mater Rudolphina Vindobonensis); Rudolf died a few months later at the age of 25.

=== Divided rule ===
Albert, then the eldest surviving brother (the second-born son Frederick III had already died in 1362), inherited the rule and shared it with his younger brother Leopold III. Both were formally enfeoffed with the Duchy of Austria, Duchy of Styria, Duchy of Carinthia, and Duchy of Carniola by Emperor Charles IV. In 1369 the Habsburg dukes succeeded the late Meinhard III, Count of Gorizia-Tyrol in the County of Tyrol, when after a drawn-out conflict the Wittelsbach Duke Stephen II of Bavaria finally renounced his rights.

In 1368 the Habsburg brothers purchased the Swabian city of Freiburg. But their attempt to gain control over the Adriatic port of Trieste failed in an armed conflict with the Republic of Venice in 1369/70. Trieste was not won until 1382, when the citizens sought protection from Venice by subjecting themselves to Austrian rule. In 1374 the Austrian dukes inherited large territories in the Windic March and Istria from the late Albert III, Count of Gorizia, which they attached to the Duchy of Carniola. The next year they acquired the Swabian lordship of Feldkirch from the Counts of Montfort, the nucleus of the Habsburg possessions in later Vorarlberg.

Tension developed between the brothers, and in 1379 Albert and Leopold, by the Treaty of Neuberg divided the extended Habsburg territories. Albert received Austria proper (Austria Inferior), while Leopold get Styria, Carinthia and Carniola (Austria Interior), Tyrol (Austria Superior) and the dynasty's original possessions in Swabia (Austria Anterior). The division of the Habsburgs into the Albertinian Line and Leopoldian line was a significant disadvantage in competition with the rival Wittelsbach and Luxembourg dynasties. It persisted until 1490, when Archduke Sigismund of Tyrol and Further Austria handed over his estates to his cousin King Maximilian I.

=== Politics ===
In 1377, Albert went on a crusade in Prussia against pagan Baltic Lithuanian and Samogitian tribes.

Meanwhile, the expansion of the Habsburg dukes in Swabia collided with the growth of the Old Swiss Confederacy and sparked armed revolts. In 1386 Duke Leopold III and numerous Austrian nobles were killed in a disastrous defeat at the 1386 Battle of Sempach, whereafter Albert once again became sole ruler over the Albertinian and Leopoldian lands, acting as regent for his minor nephews. Another attempt to restore Habsburg rule in Swabia failed, when Albert's knights were again defeated by the Swiss pike squares in the 1388 Battle of Näfels and the duke had to call for an armistice.

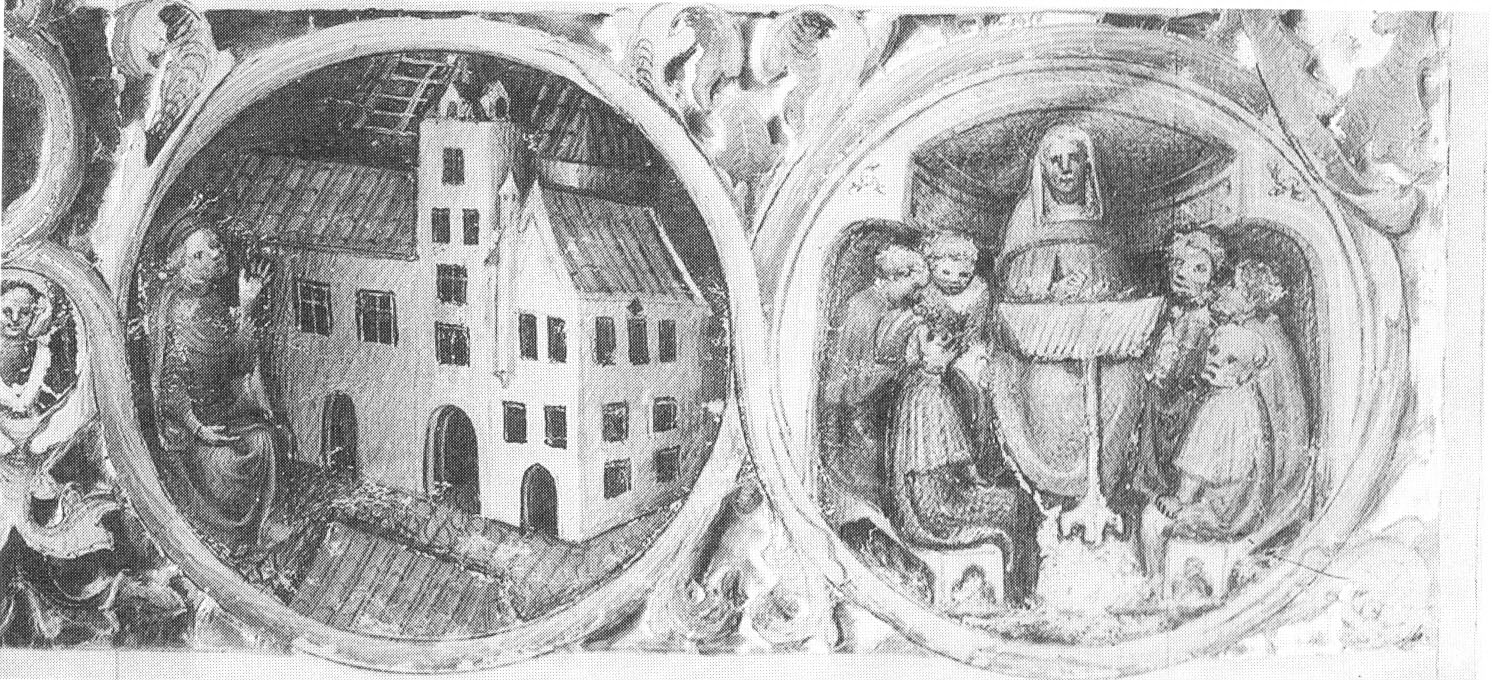
Albert inaugurates the Collegium ducale (left), theological lecture (right), contemporary illumination

In the Austrian lands, his government was beneficial to the realm, as he supported the arts and sciences. Albert was an apt scholar himself, particularly as a mathematician and astrologer. The eldest preserved book of the Austrian National Library, a 1386 Evangelion, comes from his personal property. The duke expanded the University of Vienna and, during the Western Schism, reached the consent of Pope Urban VI to establish a theological faculty. He continued the building of St. Stephen's Cathedral and attempted to refurbish Vienna modelled on Emperor Charles' residence in Prague. Albert's nickname refers to his particular hairstyle, part of the vestments of a short-lived chivalric order (Zopforden) he had established and which dissolved upon his death.

By the end of his reign, Albert had established a firm princely rule over the Austrian duchy, stretching along the Danube from the Hungarian border on the Leitha River in the east to the Hausruck range in the west. In the conflict over the succession upon the death of Emperor Charles IV in 1378, Albert joined the forces of the Luxembourg heirs Jobst of Moravia and Sigismund against the incapable king Wenceslaus and seemed a likely candidate for the German throne himself. However, he died in August 1395 while staying in his Laxenburg hunting lodge, during the preparations of a military campaign to achieve Wenceslaus' deposition which took place in 1400. He is buried in the Ducal Crypt in the Stephansdom cathedral in Vienna.

== Family and children ==
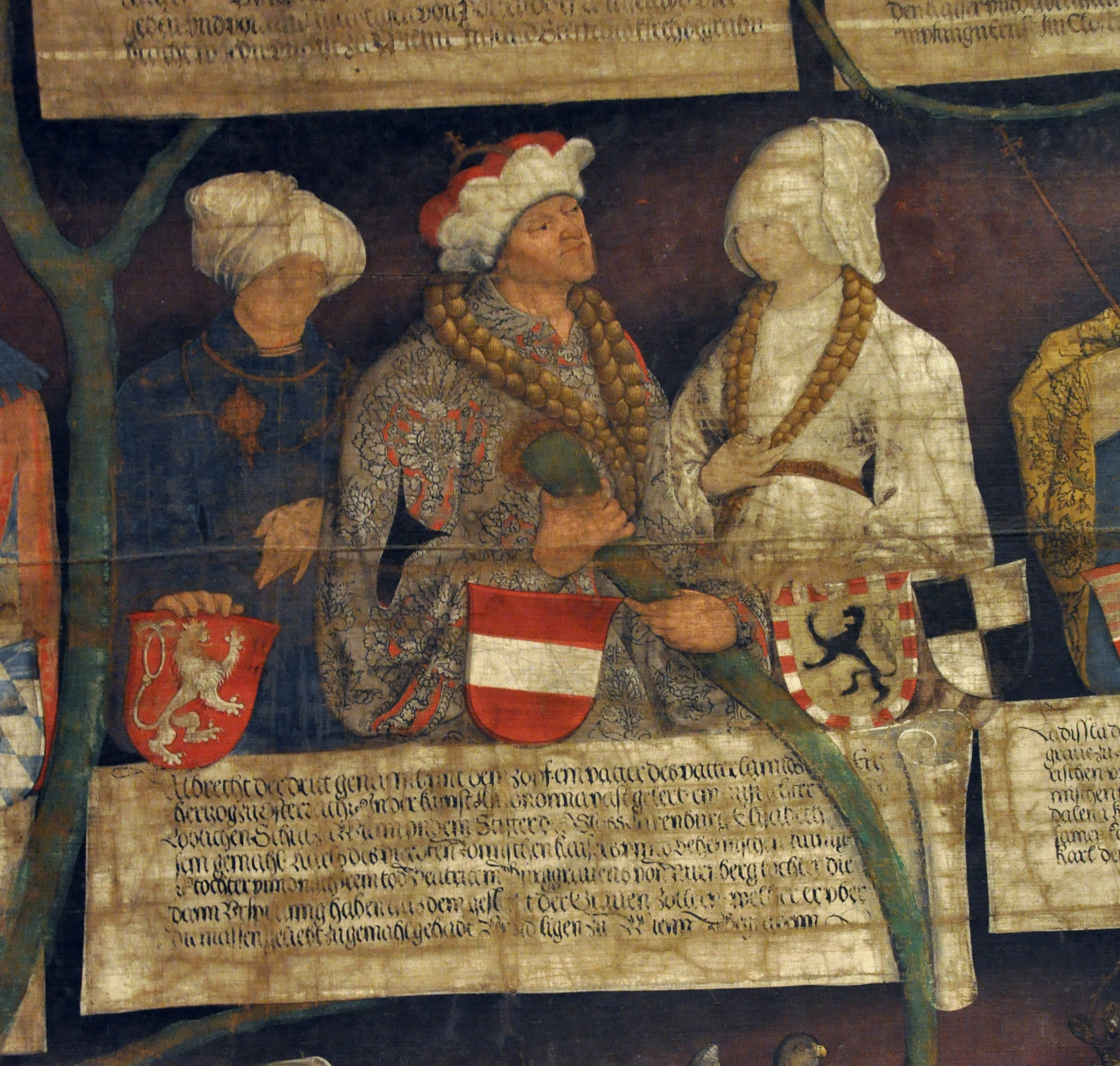
Albert and his wives Elisabeth (left) and Beatrix (right), Habsburg pedigree, 1497

Albert III was married twice. The first marriage, after 19 March 1366, was with Elisabeth of Bohemia, a daughter of the Luxembourg emperor Charles IV. This marriage was childless; his wife died at age fifteen. Afterwards, he married Beatrix of Nuremberg, a daughter of the Hohenzollern burgrave Frederick V of Nuremberg and his wife Elisabeth of Meissen, a member of the House of Wettin and a descendant of the extinct Babenberg dukes of Austria.

Beatrix gave him his only son, Albert IV, who succeeded him but soon had to cede the rule over the Inner Austrian, Tyrolean and Further Austrian possessions to his Leopoldian cousins William and Leopold IV. The Albertinian line became extinct with the death of Ladislaus the Posthumous in 1457.

== Male-line family tree ==
House of Habsburg

Original line
Albert; Count of Habsburg c. 1188–1239
Rudolf I of Germany c. 1218–1291
Albert I of Germany; 1255–1308	Hartmann; 1263–1281	Rudolf II; Duke of Austria; 1270–1290
Rudolf I of Bohemia; 1281–1307	Frederick the Fair c. 1289–1330	Leopold I Duke of Austria; 1290–1326	Albert II; Duke of Austria; 1298–1358	Henry the Friendly; 1299–1327	Otto; Duke of Austria; 1301–1339	John; Parricida c. 1290–1312/1313
Albertinian line	Leopoldian line
Rudolf IV; Duke of Austria; 1339–1365	Frederick III; 1347–1362	Albert III; Duke of Austria; 1349–1395	Leopold III; Duke of Austria; 1351–1386	Frederick II; Duke of Austria; 1327–1344	Leopold II; Duke of Austria; 1328–1344
Albert IV; Duke of Austria; 1377–1404	William; Duke of Austria c. 1370–1406	Leopold IV; Duke of Austria; 1371–1411	Ernest; Duke of Austria; 1377–1424	Frederick IV; Duke of Austria; 1382–1439
Albert II of Germany; 1397–1439	Frederick III; HRE; 1415–1493	Albert VI; Archduke of Austria; 1418–1463	Sigismund; Archduke of Austria; 1427–1496
Ladislaus the Posthumous; 1440–1457	Maximilian I HRE; 1459–1519
Philip I of Castile; 1478–1506
Spanish / Iberian line	Austrian / HRE line
Charles V HRE; 1500–1558	Ferdinand I HRE; 1503–1564
Philip II of Spain; 1527–1598	Maximilian II; HRE; 1527–1576	Ferdinand II; Archduke of Austria; 1529–1595	Charles II; Archduke of Austria; 1540–1590
Carlos; Prince of Asturias; 1545–1568	Philip III of Spain; 1578–1621	Rudolf II; HRE; 1552–1612	Ernest of Austria; 1553–1595	Matthias; HRE; 1557–1619	Maximilian III; Archduke of Austria; 1558–1618	Albert VII; Archduke of Austria; 1559–1621	Wenceslaus; Archduke of Austria; 1561–1578	Andrew; Margrave of Burgau; 1558–1600	Charles; Margrave of Burgau; 1560–1618	Ferdinand II; HRE; 1578–1637	Maximilian Ernest of Austria; 1583–1616	Leopold V Archduke of Austria; 1586–1632	Charles of Austria; 1590–1624
Philip IV of Spain; 1605–1665	Charles of Austria; 1607–1632	Ferdinand of Austria; 1609–1641	John-Charles of Austria; 1605–1619	Ferdinand III; HRE; 1608–1657	Leopold Wilhelm of Austria; 1614–1662	Ferdinand Charles; Archduke of Austria; 1628–1662	Sigismund Francis; Archduke of Austria; 1630–1665
Balthasar Charles; Prince of Asturias; 1629–1646	Charles II of Spain; 1661–1700	Ferdinand IV; King of the Romans; 1633–1654	Leopold I HRE; 1640–1705	Charles Joseph of Austria; 1649–1664
Joseph I HRE; 1678–1711	Charles VI; HRE; 1685–1740
Lorraine
Maria Theresa; HRE; 1740–1780	Francis I HRE; 1745–1765
Habsburg-Lorraine
Joseph II; HRE; 1765–1790	Leopold II; HRE; 1790–1792
Francis II; HRE; 1792–1806

== Sources ==
- Previte-Orton, C.W. (1952). The Shorter Cambridge Medieval History: The Twelfth Century to the Renaissance. Vol. 2. Cambridge University Press.

Albert III of Austria House of Habsburg Born: 9 September 1349 Died: 29 August 1395
Preceded by Rudolf IV	Duke of Austria; 1365–1395 with Leopold III (1365–1379)	Succeeded by Albert IV
Preceded by Rudolf IV	Duke of Styria, Carinthia and Carniola; Count of Tyrol; 1365–1379 with Leopold III	Succeeded by Leopold III
Preceded by Leopold III	Count of Tyrol; 1386–1395	Succeeded by Leopold IV
