= Elisabeth of Carinthia, Queen of Germany =

Queen of Germany from 1298 to 1308

Elisabeth of Carinthia
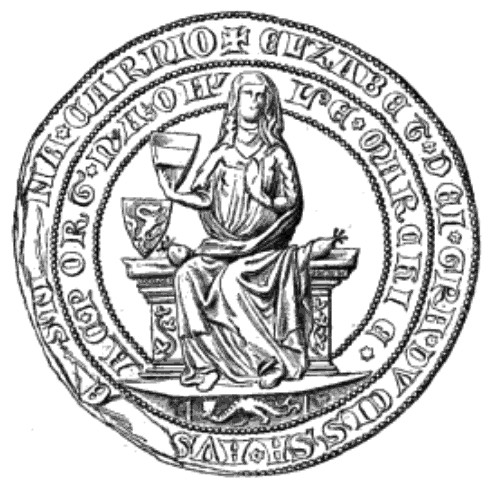
- Elisabeth's seal as queen

Queen consort of the Romans
- Tenure: 27 July 1298 – 1 May 1308
- Born: c. 1262; Munich, Bavaria
- Died: 28 October 1312; Königsfelden, Swabia
- Burial: Saint Paul's Abbey, Carinthia
- Spouse: Albert I of Germany
- Issue Detail: Rudolph I of Bohemia; Frederick the Fair; Leopold I, Duke of Austria; Albert II, Duke of Austria; Henry the Gentle; Otto, Duke of Austria; Anna, Margravine of Brandenburg and Duchess of Wrocław; Agnes, Queen of Hungary; Elizabeth, Duchess of Lorraine; Catherine, Duchess of Calabria
- House: House of Gorizia
- Father: Meinhard, Duke of Carinthia
- Mother: Elisabeth of Bavaria

Elisabeth of Carinthia (also known as Elisabeth of Tyrol; c. 1262 – 28 October 1312), was a Duchess of Austria from 1282 and Queen of Germany from 1298 until 1308, by marriage to King Albert I of the House of Habsburg.

== Early life ==
Born in Munich, Bavaria, Elisabeth was the eldest daughter of Count Meinhard of Gorizia-Tyrol, and Elizabeth of Bavaria, Queen of Germany, widow of the late Hohenstaufen King Conrad IV of Germany.

Elizabeth thus was a half-sister of Conradin, King of Jerusalem and Duke of Swabia. Elizabeth was in fact better connected to powerful German rulers than her future husband: a descendant of earlier monarchs, for example Emperor Frederick Barbarossa, she was also a niece of the Bavarian dukes, Austria's important neighbors.

== Duchess and Queen ==
Elisabeth was married in Vienna on 20 December 1274 to Count Albert I of Habsburg, eldest son and heir of the newly elected Rudolf I, King of the Romans, thus becoming daughter-in-law of the King of the Romans and Emperor-to-be. After Rudolf had defeated his rival King Ottokar II of Bohemia in the 1278 Battle on the Marchfeld, he invested his son Albert with the duchies of Austria and Styria at the Imperial Diet in Augsburg on 17 December 1282.

Albert initially had to share the rule with his younger brother Rudolf II, who nevertheless had to waive his rights according to the Treaty of Rheinfelden the next year. Duke Albert and Elizabeth solidified their rule in what was to become the Habsburg "hereditary lands", also with the help of Elizabeth's father Meinhard, who in his turn was created Duke of Carinthia by King Rudolf I in 1286.

Elizabeth was described as shrewd and enterprising, in possession of some commercial talents. The construction of the Saline plant in Salzkammergut goes back to her suggestion.

Upon the death of Albert's father in 1291, the princes elected Count Adolf of Nassau German king, while Duke Albert himself became entangled in internal struggles with the Austrian nobility. Not until Adolf's deposition in 1298, Elizabeth's husband was finally elected King of the Romans on 23 June 1298. Two weeks later, Adolf was defeated and killed in the Battle of Göllheim. In 1299, Elizabeth was crowned Queen of the Romans in Nuremberg.

== Later life ==
On 1 May 1308 Albert was murdered by his nephew John Parricida near Windisch, Swabia (in modern Switzerland). Afterward Elisabeth had the Poor Clare monastery of Königsfelden erected at the site, where she also died on 28 October 1312 and was also buried. Today her bones rest at Saint Paul's Abbey in Carinthia.

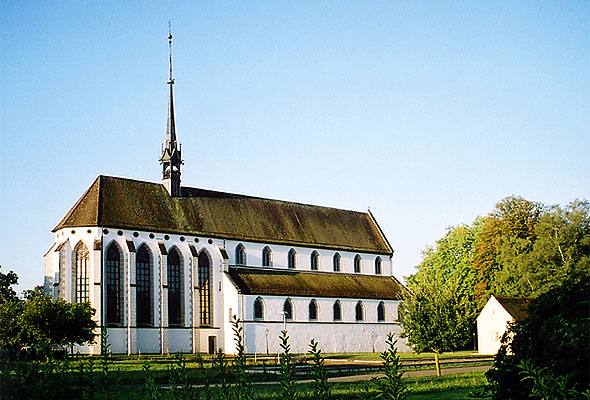
Königsfelden monastery church

== Issue ==
Elizabeth's and Albert's children were:

1. Anna (1275, Vienna – 19 March 1327, Breslau).
  1. married in Graz ca. 1295 to Margrave Herman, Margrave of Brandenburg-Salzwedel (ca. 1275 – 1308);
  2. married in Breslau 1310 to Duke Heinrich VI of Breslau (1294-1335).
2. Agnes (18 May 1281 – 10 June 1364, Königsfelden)
  1. married in Vienna on 13 February 1296 to King Andrew III of Hungary (ca. 1265-1301).
3. Rudolf III (ca. 1282 – 4 July 1307), married but line extinct. He predeceased his father.
  1. married on 25 May 1300 to Duchess Blanche of France (ca. 1282 – 1305);
  2. married in Prague on 16 October 1306 to Elizabeth Richeza of Poland (1288 – 1335).
4. Elisabeth (1285 – 19 May 1353).
  1. married in 1304 to Frederick IV, Duke of Lorraine (1282 – 1328).
5. Frederick I (1289 – 13 January 1330).
  1. married on 11 May 1315 to Isabella of Aragon, Queen of Germany (1305 – 1330) but line extinct.
6. Leopold I (4 August 1290 – 28 February 1326, Strassburg).
  1. married in 1315 to Catherine of Savoy (1284 – 1336).
7. Catherine (1295 – 18 January 1323, Naples).
  1. married in 1316 to Charles, Duke of Calabria (1328 – 1298).
8. Albert II (12 December 1298, Vienna – 20 July 1358, Vienna).
  1. married in Vienna on 15 February 1324 to Joanna of Pfirt (ca. 1300 – 1351).
9. Henry the Gentle (1299 – 3 February 1327, Bruck an der Mur).
  1. married Countess Elizabeth of Virneburg but line extinct.
10. Meinhard (1300 – 1301).
11. Otto (23 July 1301, Vienna – 26 February 1339, Vienna).
  1. married on 15 May 1325 to Elizabeth of Bavaria, Duchess of Austria (ca. 1306 – 1330);
  2. married on 16 February 1335 to Anne of Bohemia, Duchess of Austria (1323 – 1338).
12. Jutta (1302 – 5 March 1329).
  1. married in Baden 26 March 1319 to Count Ludwig VI of Öttingen.

== Sources ==
- Lodge, Richard (1906). The Close of the Middle Ages, 1272-1494. Rivington.
- Clauss, Martin (2010). "Germany". In Rogers, Clifford J. (ed.). The Oxford Encyclopedia of Medieval Warfare and Military Technology. Vol. 2. Oxford University Press.
- Štih, Peter (2010). The Middle Ages between the Eastern Alps and the Northern Adriatic. Brill.

Elisabeth of Carinthia, Queen of Germany House of Gorizia Born: c. 1262 Died: 28 October 1312
Royal titles
Preceded by Imagina of Isenburg-Limburg	Queen consort of Germany; 1298 – 1308	Succeeded by Margaret of Brabant
