= Elisabeth of Austria, Duchess of Lorraine =

Elisabeth of Austria
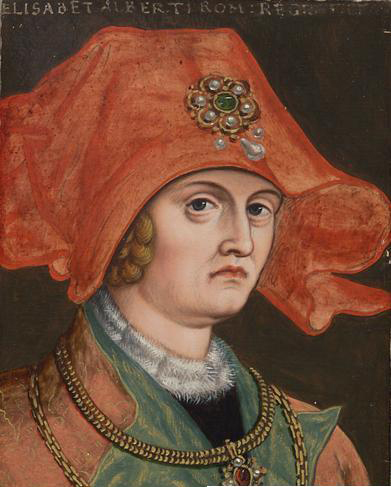
- Posthumous portrait of Elisabeth by Anton Boys

Duchess consort of Lorraine
- Tenure: 1307–1329
- Born: c. 1285; Vienna, Duchy of Austria, Holy Roman Empire
- Died: 19 May 1353 (aged 67–68); Nancy, Duchy of Lorraine, Holy Roman Empire
- Burial: Königsfelden Monastery, County of Tyrol, Holy Roman Empire
- Spouse: Frederick IV, Duke of Lorraine (m. 1304; died 1328)
- Issue Among others...: Rudolph, Duke of Lorraine; Margaret, Countess of Friburg
- House: House of Habsburg
- Father: Albert I of Germany
- Mother: Elisabeth of Tirol

Elisabeth of Austria (c. 1285 – 19 May 1353), also known as Isabelle, was Duchess of Lorraine as the wife of Duke Frederick IV, and regent of Lorraine during the minority of their son Rudolph from 1329 until 1331. She was also a member of the House of Habsburg.

== Life ==
Elisabeth was the tenth of twelve children to King Albert I of Habsburg and his wife Queen Elisabeth of Gorizia-Tyrol. She was the sister of King Rudolph I of Bohemia, King Frederick the Fair, Leopold I, Duke of Austria, Albert II, Duke of Austria, Otto, Duke of Austria, Agnes, Queen of Hungary and Anna, Margravine of Brandenburg.

=== Duchess of Lorraine ===
Elisabeth was betrothed at a young age to one of the sons of Philip IV of France, so her father could make stronger connections with France. On May 25, 1300, Elisabeth's eldest brother Rudolph I of Bohemia married Blanche of France, a daughter of Philip III. After this marriage, Elisabeth's betrothal to one of Philip's sons was scrapped.

Elisabeth was instead married to Frederick IV, Duke of Lorraine. The contract was signed on 6 August 1306 and they married in 1307. From this marriage Elisabeth became Duchess of Lorraine and Frederick was able to support Elisabeth's brother Frederick the Fair, to become Holy Roman Emperor. Elisabeth's husband was captured at the Battle of Mühldorf, where he was fighting for Elisabeth's brother and was released by the King of France. Elisabeth became known as Isabelle in Lorraine.

=== Regency ===
Elisabeth outlived Frederick. Frederick left Lorriane to their young son Rudolph and Elisabeth became regent for her son. Her regency lasted from 1329 to 1331. Rudolph married aged only ten to Eleanor of Bar and made his father-in-law Edward I of Bar regent in place of Elisabeth.

Elisabeth died in Nancy, capital of the Duchy of Lorraine, on 19 May 1353 and was buried in the cemetery of the Poor Clare monastery in Königsfelden in the County of Tyrol.

== Children ==
Elisabeth and Frederick were married for twenty two years, in that time the couple had six children:

- Rudolph, Duke of Lorraine (1320 – 26 August 1346), successor of his father
- Frederick, Earl of Luneville
- Margaret (died 9 August 1376), married Jean de Chalon, lord of Auberive (died 1350), then Conrad, count of Friburg, and lastly Ulrich (died 1377), lord of Rappoltstein
- Agnes (died young)
- Theobald (died young)
- Albert (died young)

Many of the couple's children died during childhood, only Rudolph and Margaret lived to adulthood.

== Sources ==
- Bogdan, Henry (2007). La Lorraine des Ducs (in French). Perrin.
