= Leopold II, Duke of Austria =

Leopold II
- Duke of Austria
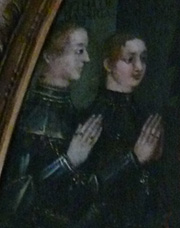
- Leopold II and his brother Frederick II
- Born: 1328
- Died: 10 August 1344 (aged 15–16)
- House: House of Habsburg
- Father: Otto, Duke of Austria
- Mother: Elizabeth of Bavaria

Leopold II, Duke of Austria (1328 – 10 August 1344), a member of the House of Habsburg, was the younger son of Duke Otto the Merry.

Otto's first wife was Elizabeth of Bavaria, a daughter of Stephen I, Duke of Bavaria by his marriage to Jutta of Schweidnitz. They had two sons, Leopold and his brother Frederick III (1327–1344), and after their father's death in 1339 both were titular Dukes of Austria, but both died before coming of age. On 10 August 1344, at the age of sixteen, Leopold died suddenly. On 11 December 1344, four months later, his brother Frederick also died equally suddenly. In both cases, there were suspicions of poisoning. The beneficiary of their deaths was their uncle Albert II, Duke of Austria, the brother of Otto, who continued to rule Austria until his death in 1358.

== Ancestry ==
Ancestors of Leopold II, Duke of Austria

8. Rudolf I of Germany
4. Albert I of Germany
9. Gertrude of Hohenberg
2. Otto, Duke of Austria
10. Meinhard, Duke of Carinthia
5. Elisabeth of Carinthia, Queen of the Romans
11. Elisabeth of Bavaria, Queen of Germany
1. Leopold II, Duke of Austria
12. Henry XIII, Duke of Bavaria
6. Stephen I, Duke of Bavaria
13. Elizabeth of Hungary, Duchess of Bavaria
3. Elizabeth of Bavaria, Duchess of Austria
14. Bolko I the Strict
7. Jutta of Schweidnitz
15. Beatrice of Brandenburg

== Male-line family tree ==
House of Habsburg

Original line
Albert; Count of Habsburg c. 1188–1239
Rudolf I of Germany c. 1218–1291
Albert I of Germany; 1255–1308 | Hartmann; 1263–1281 | Rudolf II; Duke of Austria; 1270–1290
Rudolf I of Bohemia; 1281–1307 | Frederick the Fair c. 1289–1330 | Leopold I Duke of Austria; 1290–1326 | Albert II; Duke of Austria; 1298–1358 | Henry the Friendly; 1299–1327 | Otto; Duke of Austria; 1301–1339 | John; Parricida c. 1290–1312/1313
Albertinian line | Leopoldian line
Rudolf IV; Duke of Austria; 1339–1365 | Frederick III; 1347–1362 | Albert III; Duke of Austria; 1349–1395 | Leopold III; Duke of Austria; 1351–1386 | Frederick II; Duke of Austria; 1327–1344 | Leopold II; Duke of Austria; 1328–1344
Albert IV; Duke of Austria; 1377–1404 | William; Duke of Austria c. 1370–1406 | Leopold IV; Duke of Austria; 1371–1411 | Ernest; Duke of Austria; 1377–1424 | Frederick IV; Duke of Austria; 1382–1439
Albert II of Germany; 1397–1439 | Frederick III; HRE; 1415–1493 | Albert VI; Archduke of Austria; 1418–1463 | Sigismund; Archduke of Austria; 1427–1496
Ladislaus the Posthumous; 1440–1457 | Maximilian I HRE; 1459–1519
Philip I of Castile; 1478–1506
Spanish / Iberian line | Austrian / HRE line
Charles V HRE; 1500–1558 | Ferdinand I HRE; 1503–1564
Philip II of Spain; 1527–1598 | Maximilian II; HRE; 1527–1576 | Ferdinand II; Archduke of Austria; 1529–1595 | Charles II; Archduke of Austria; 1540–1590
Carlos; Prince of Asturias; 1545–1568 | Philip III of Spain; 1578–1621 | Rudolf II; HRE; 1552–1612 | Ernest of Austria; 1553–1595 | Matthias; HRE; 1557–1619 | Maximilian III; Archduke of Austria; 1558–1618 | Albert VII; Archduke of Austria; 1559–1621 | Wenceslaus; Archduke of Austria; 1561–1578 | Andrew; Margrave of Burgau; 1558–1600 | Charles; Margrave of Burgau; 1560–1618 | Ferdinand II; HRE; 1578–1637 | Maximilian Ernest of Austria; 1583–1616 | Leopold V Archduke of Austria; 1586–1632 | Charles of Austria; 1590–1624
Philip IV of Spain; 1605–1665 | Charles of Austria; 1607–1632 | Ferdinand of Austria; 1609–1641 | John-Charles of Austria; 1605–1619 | Ferdinand III; HRE; 1608–1657 | Leopold Wilhelm of Austria; 1614–1662 | Ferdinand Charles; Archduke of Austria; 1628–1662 | Sigismund Francis; Archduke of Austria; 1630–1665
Balthasar Charles; Prince of Asturias; 1629–1646 | Charles II of Spain; 1661–1700 | Ferdinand IV; King of the Romans; 1633–1654 | Leopold I HRE; 1640–1705 | Charles Joseph of Austria; 1649–1664
Joseph I HRE; 1678–1711 | Charles VI; HRE; 1685–1740
Lorraine
Maria Theresa; HRE; 1740–1780 | Francis I HRE; 1745–1765
Habsburg-Lorraine
Joseph II; HRE; 1765–1790 | Leopold II; HRE; 1790–1792
Francis II; HRE; 1792–1806
