= John V of Brandenburg-Salzwedel =

14th Century Margrave of Brandenburg-Salzwedel

John V, Margrave of Brandenburg-Salzwedel
- Born: 1302
- Died: 26 March 1317
- Noble family: House of Ascania
- Spouse: Catherine of Glogau
- Father: Herman, Margrave of Brandenburg-Salzwedel
- Mother: Anne of Austria

Margrave John V of Brandenburg-Salzwedel, nicknamed "the Illustrious" (in Latin Illustris), (1302 – 26 March 1317) was Margrave and co-ruler of Brandenburg from 1308 until his death.

His parents were Margrave Hermann, "the Tall" of Brandenburg and Anne of Austria, a daughter of Emperor Albert I, Duke of Austria and King of Bohemia. John married Catherine (d. 1327), a daughter of Duke Henry III of Glogau and Sagan.

John V died in 1317. With his death, the Brandenburg-Salzwedel line of the House of Ascania died out.
