= Anne of Bohemia (disambiguation) =

Anne of Bohemia may refer to:

- Anne of Bohemia (1204–1265), Duchess consort of Silesia
- Anne of Bohemia (1290–1313), eldest surviving daughter of Venceslaus II of Bohemia, first wife of Henry of Carinthia, 1306–1310 king of Bohemia
- Anne of Bohemia, Duchess of Austria (1323–1338), daughter of John of Bohemia, second wife of Otto, Duke of Austria
- Anne of Bohemia (1366–1394), a daughter of Charles IV, Holy Roman Emperor, first wife of Richard II of England
- Anne, Duchess of Luxembourg (1432–1462), daughter of Elisabeth II of Bohemia, wife of William III, Duke of Luxembourg
- Anna of Bohemia and Hungary (1503–1547), the only daughter of Vladislaus II of Bohemia and Hungary
- Anna of Austria (1528–1590), daughter of Anna of Bohemia and Hungary, wife of Albert V, Duke of Bavaria
- Anna of Austria (1549–1580), daughter of Maximilian II, Holy Roman Emperor, fourth wife of Philip II of Spain
- Anne of Austria, Queen of Poland (1573–1598), Queen consort of Poland and Sweden, wife of Sigismund III Vasa
- Anna of Tyrol, also known as Anna of Austria, Empress Matthias (1585–1618), daughter of Ferdinand II, Archduke of Further Austria, wife of Matthias, Holy Roman Emperor, king of Bohemia
