= Windisch, Switzerland =

Place in Aargau, Switzerland

Windisch
- Municipality
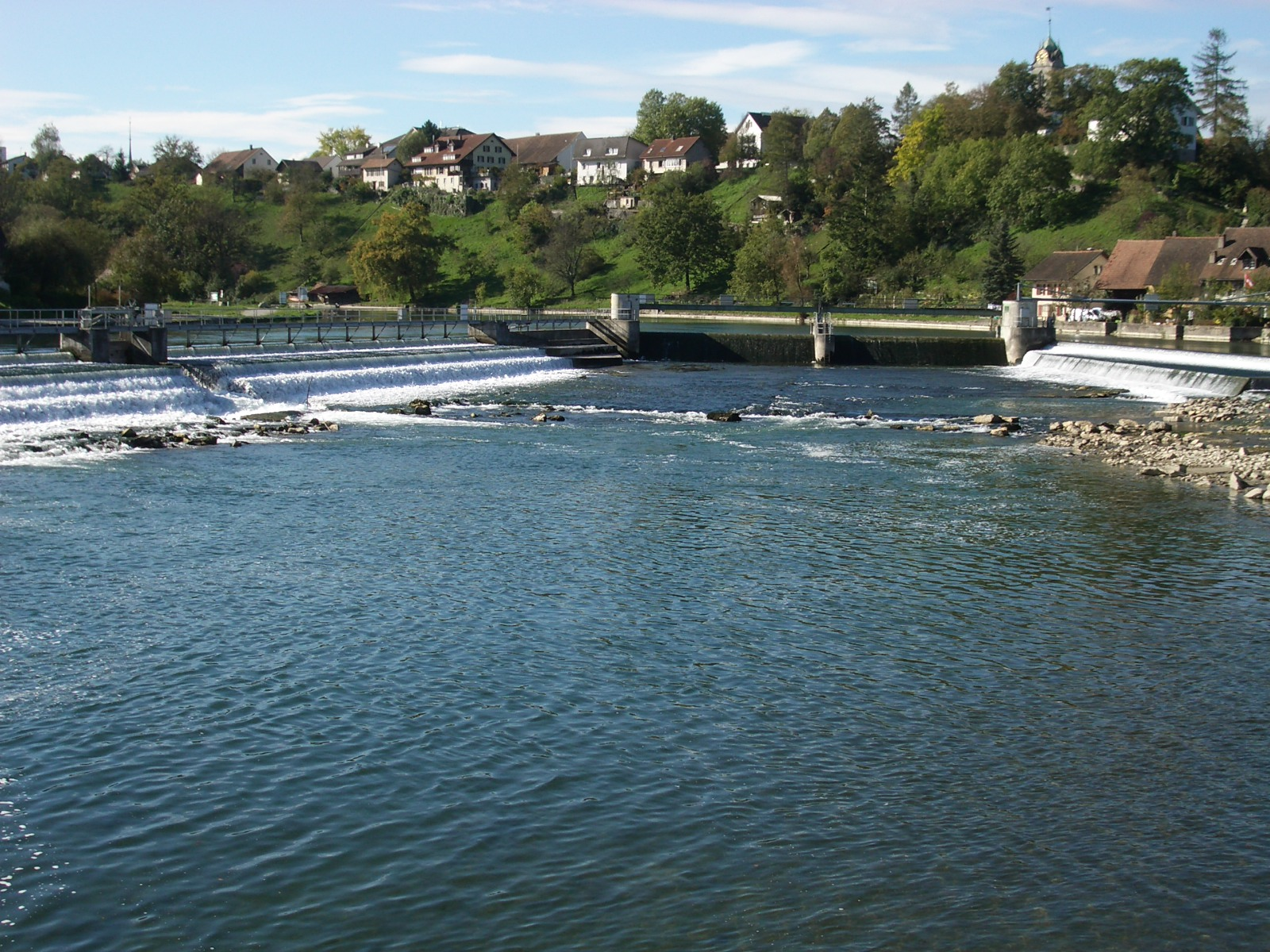

- Flag Coat of arms
- Location of Windisch
- Location within Switzerland Location within Canton of Aargau
- Coordinates: 47°29′N 8°13′E
- Country: Switzerland
- Canton: Aargau
- District: Brugg

Government
  - Mayor: Luzia Capanni SPS/PSS (as of 1.1.2026)

Area
  - Total: 4.91 km^{2} (1.90 sq mi)
- Elevation: 357 m (1,171 ft)

Population (December 2020)
  - Total: 7,733
  - Density: 1,570/km^{2} (4,080/sq mi)
- Time zone: UTC+01:00 (CET)
  - Summer (DST): UTC+02:00 (CEST)
- Postal code: 5210
- SFOS number: 4123
- ISO 3166 code: CH-AG
- Surrounded by: Birmenstorf, Brugg, Gebenstorf, Hausen, Mülligen
- Website: www.windisch.ch

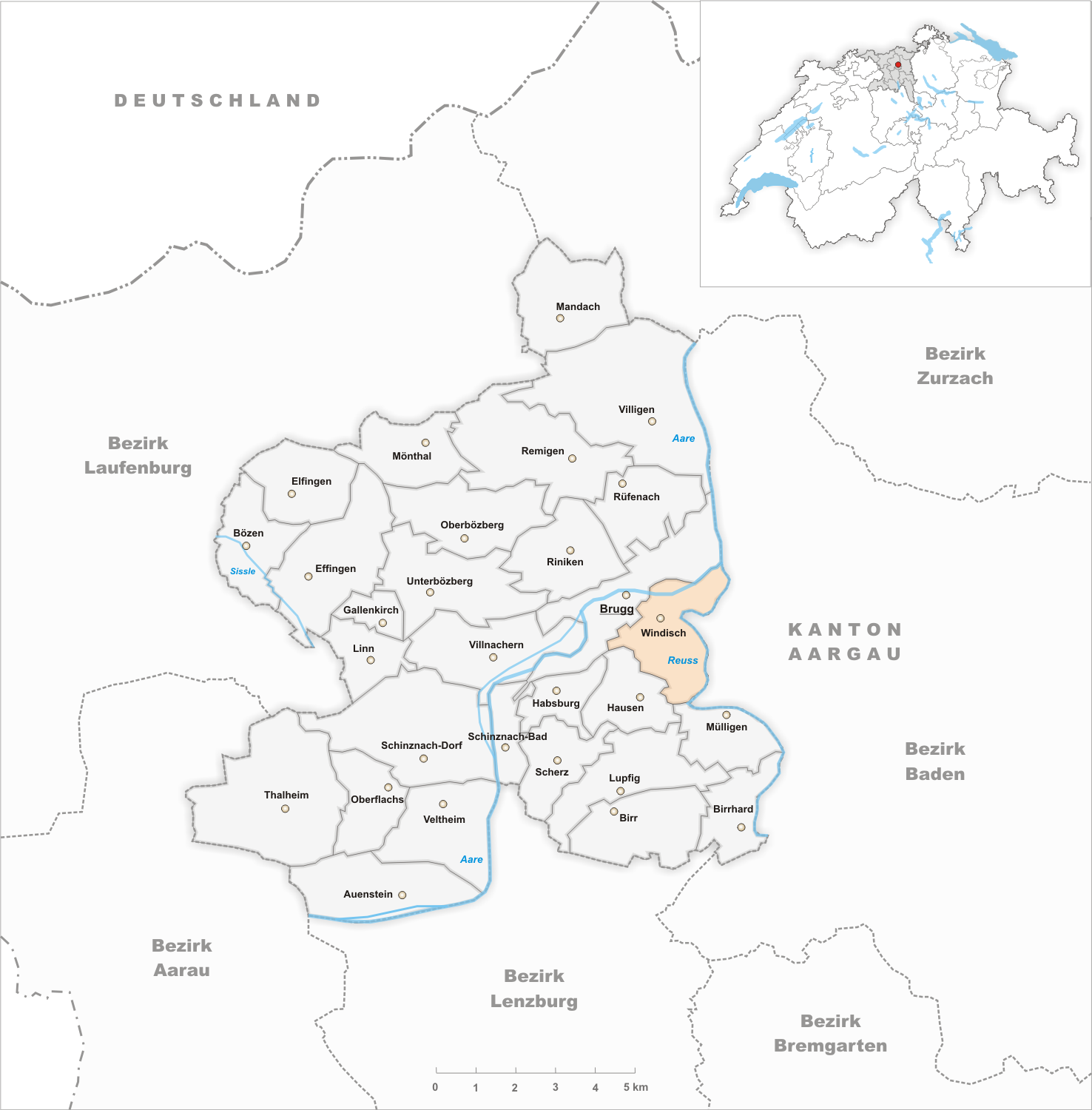
Windisch

Windisch is a municipality in the district of Brugg in the canton of Aargau in Switzerland.

== Etymology ==
Windisch is situated at the site of the Roman legion camp Vindonissa. Originally a Celtic God, the name Vindos points to a widespread prehistorical cult of Vindos and the most likely origin of the Windisch place name. In 1064 the current municipality was mentioned as Vinse, and in 1175 as Vindisse. Until the 19th Century the official name was Windisch und Oberburg.

== History ==
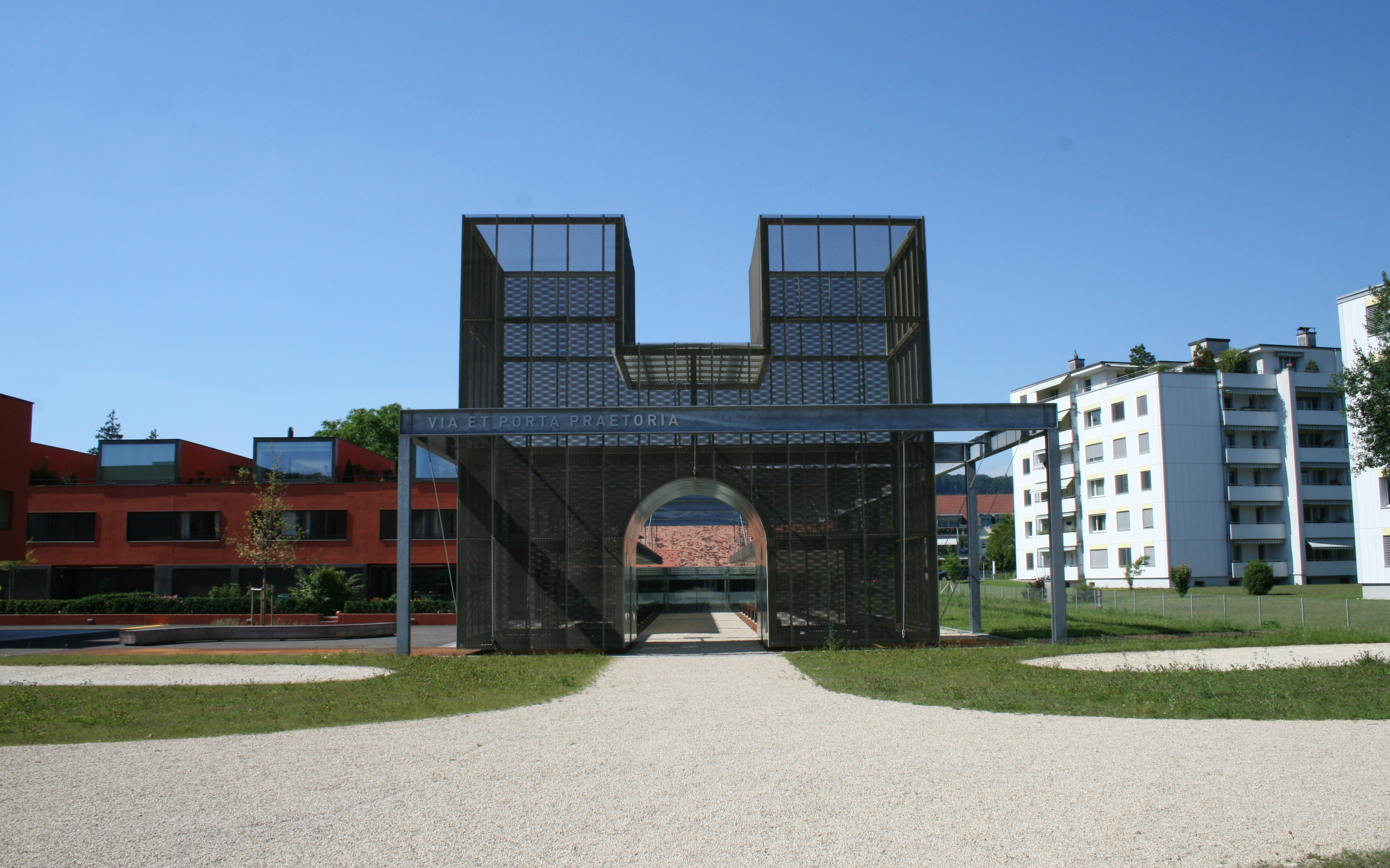
Location of the south gate of the Vindonissa camp

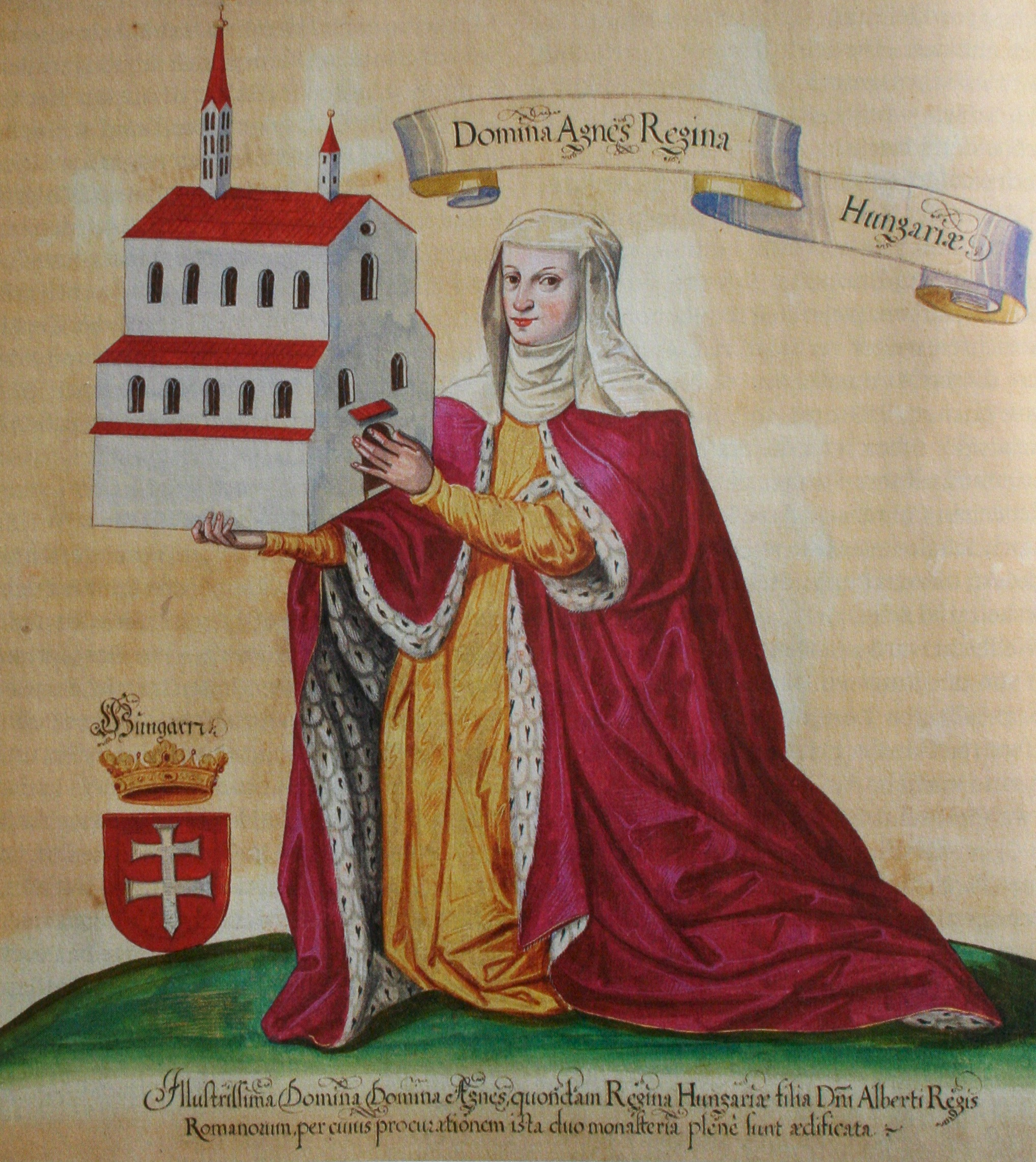
Agnes of Hungary with Königsfelden Abbey

Windisch grew into a regional power following the foundation of Königsfelden Abbey in 1309 in memory of the regicide of King Albert I of Germany in the previous year. Albert was on the way to suppress a revolt in Swabia when he was murdered on May 1, 1308, near Windisch on the Reuss, by his nephew John of Swabi, afterwards called "the Parricide" or "John Parricida", whom he had deprived of his inheritance. After the foundation of the Abbey, the village was placed under the authority of the Abbey. Starting in 1348 the rights to high and low justice were held by Agnes of Hungary, a daughter of Albert I. In 1411 those rights transferred back to the monastery. The abbey church, possibly in antiquity under the patronage of St. Martin but in the Middle Ages under the patronage of Mary, is built on the site of the 6th Century Bishop's church. The present building, with a late-Romanesque nave and Gothic choir, was built between 1310-30. The church's charnel house was rebuilt in 1793 into a schoolhouse.

After the conquest of the Aargau by Bern and the introduction of the Reformation (1528) the monastery was suppressed. Until 1798 it served as the residence of the Bernese bailiffs (German: Hofmeister). People from Windisch worked in the bailiff's residence as servants, maids and workmen, while the poor came to the former abbey for alms.

The main sources of income in Windisch included handicrafting, ferries, fisheries, shipping, tavern and iron ore mining in Lindhof, but agriculture was the major contributor. There was a ferry over the Reuss on the Bern-Zurich road. This was replaced in 1799 by a bridge. Plague epidemics (in 1667 60% of the population died of the plague) and the restrictive immigration policies of the municipality prevented growth. However, during the 18th Century, the emergence of new occupations, led to a significant population increase. These new industries included cap and stocking weaving, and water powered light industry (including plaster and flour mills). At the same time improved agriculture techniques allowed more food to be produced from the fields. The nearest neighbor to Windisch was the town of Brugg. The close proximity led to centuries of conflicts over grazing rights, city monopolies, taxation and especially the location of the municipal boundary. In 1863, due to a border adjustment, Windisch lost 45 hectares (110 acres) to Brugg.

In the 19th Century the economy of the village changed. In 1825 Henry Kunz founded the cotton mill Kunz which had 567 employees in 1846. They built factory workers' homes and a village school. In 1804 part of Königsfelden Abbey converted into a District Hospital. In 1872 a new building was built and since 1887 it has been a psychiatric clinic. The construction of the railway network transformed Brugg and Windisch into a railroad hub with a large depot and repair shop (primarily for steam locomotives). These innovations resulted in the influx of factory workers, nurses and trained staff. This led to a restructuring of the population: for example, the locally born and working population fell from 88% (1815), 55% (1837) and 21% (1900) to 4% (1970), while the proportion of Catholics rose from 9% (1850) to 45% (1970). Agriculture employs only 0.6% of the population (1990). In 1965, a Higher Technical School of Windisch (now a university) opened. The changing population structure led to political shifts in favor of the Social Democratic Party (SP) (1921-49 was known as the period of the "red Windisch"). With a pronounced emphasis on political independence, Windisch grew together structurally and economically with Brugg.

== Geography ==
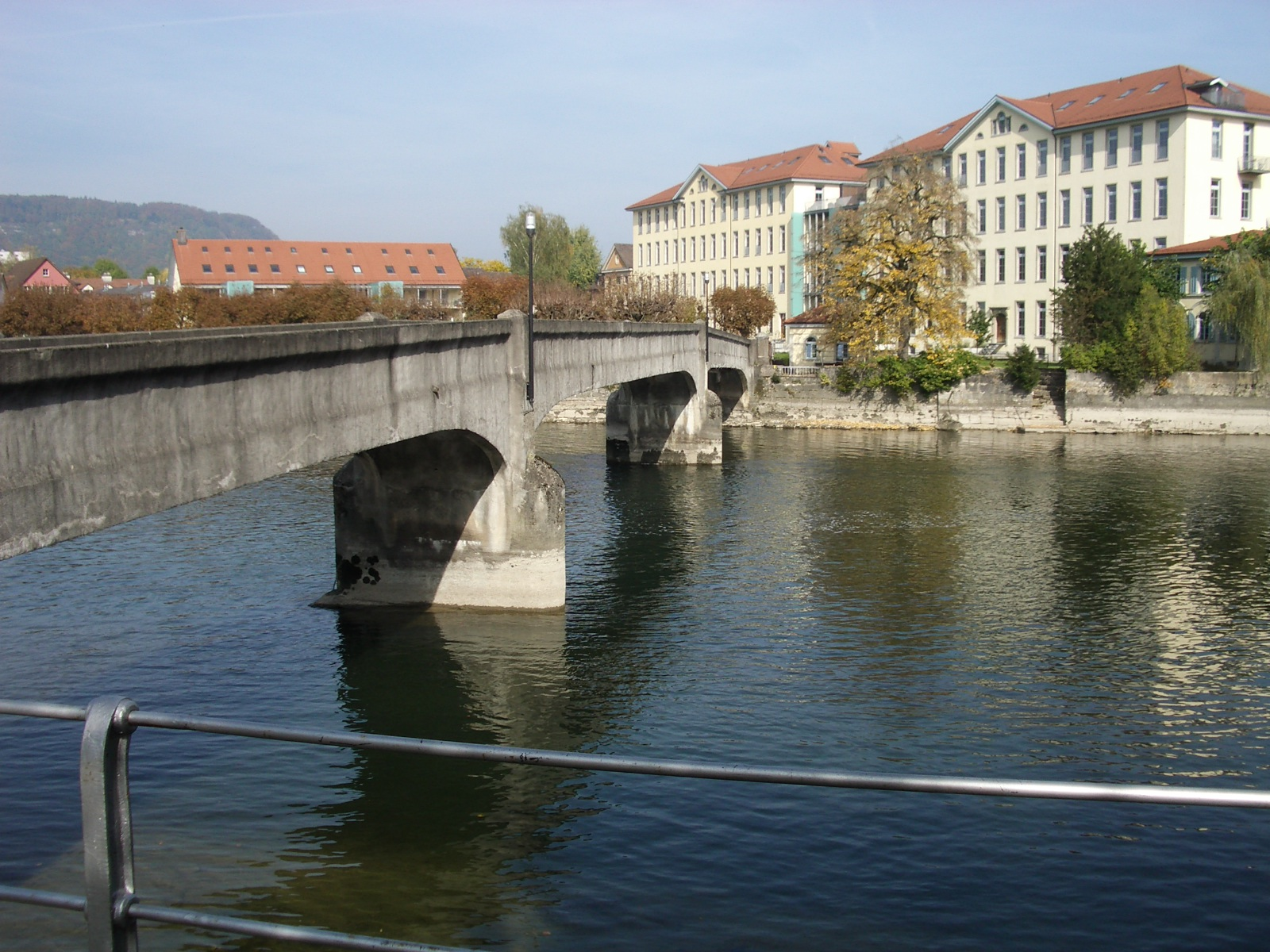
Windisch

Windisch has an area, as of 2009, of 4.91 square kilometers (1.90 sq mi). Of this area, 1.16 square kilometers (0.45 sq mi) or 23.6% is used for agricultural purposes, while 1.22 square kilometers (0.47 sq mi) or 24.8% is forested. Of the rest of the land, 2.23 square kilometers (0.86 sq mi) or 45.4% is settled (buildings or roads), 0.31 square kilometers (0.12 sq mi) or 6.3% is either rivers or lakes.

Of the built up area, industrial buildings made up 5.3% of the total area while housing and buildings made up 21.6% and transportation infrastructure made up 9.6%. Power and water infrastructure as well as other special developed areas made up 1.8% uof the area while parks, green belts and sports fields made up 7.1%. 22.4% of the total land area is heavily forested and 2.4% is covered with orchards or small clusters of trees. Of the agricultural land, 13.8% is used for growing crops and 6.9% is pastures, while 2.9% is used for orchards or vine crops. All the water in the municipality is in rivers and streams.

The municipality is located in the Brugg district, between the Aare and Reusss in the region known as the Wasserschloss. It consists of the former linear villages of Windisch and Oberburg as well as the hamlets of Fahrgut, Schürhof, Lindhof and Bachtalen and the region around the former Königsfelden Abbey.

== Coat of arms ==
The blazon of the municipal coat of arms is Or on a Sevenfold Mount Vert a Castle embattled Sable towered on dexter and to its sinister a Lion rampant Gules. The coat of arms represents the nearby Habsburg Castle and the lion of the House of Habsburg upon the verdant fields of the parish.

== Demographics ==
Aerial view (1939)

Windisch has a population (as of December 2020) of 7,733 As of June 2009, 29.1% of the population are foreign nationals. Over the last 10 years (1997–2007) the population has changed at a rate of 4.5%. Most of the population (as of 2000) speaks German (80.6%), with Italian being second most common ( 4.9%) and Serbo-Croatian being third ( 3.2%).

The age distribution, as of 2008, in Windisch is; 732 children or 11.0% of the population are between 0 and 9 years old and 783 teenagers or 11.8% are between 10 and 19. Of the adult population, 837 people or 12.6% of the population are between 20 and 29 years old. 888 people or 13.3% are between 30 and 39, 1,017 people or 15.3% are between 40 and 49, and 826 people or 12.4% are between 50 and 59. The senior population distribution is 693 people or 10.4% of the population are between 60 and 69 years old, 525 people or 7.9% are between 70 and 79, there are 302 people or 4.5% who are between 80 and 89, and there are 55 people or 0.8% who are 90 and older.

As of 2000, there were 316 homes with 1 or 2 persons in the household, 1,576 homes with 3 or 4 persons in the household, and 774 homes with 5 or more persons in the household. The average number of people per household was 2.29 individuals. As of 2000, there were 2,726 private households (homes and apartments) in the municipality, and an average of 2.3 persons per household. In 2008 there were 763 single family homes (or 24.9% of the total) out of a total of 3,066 homes and apartments. There were a total of 16 empty apartments for a 0.5% vacancy rate. As of 2007, the construction rate of new housing units was 0.6 new units per 1000 residents.

In the 2007 federal election the most popular party was the SVP which received 32.7% of the vote. The next three most popular parties were the SP (23%), the CVP (12.6%) and the FDP (10.7%).

In Windisch about 61.8% of the population (between age 25-64) have completed either non-mandatory upper secondary education or additional higher education (either university or a Fachhochschule). Of the school age population (in the 2008/2009 school year), there are 579 students attending primary school, there are 316 students attending secondary school, there are 302 students attending tertiary or university level schooling in the municipality.

The historical population is given in the following table:

Historical population
Year	Pop.	±%
1578	61	—
1736	77	+26.2%
1736	402	+422.1%
1815	661	+64.4%
1850	1,287	+94.7%
1880	2,052	+59.4%
1900	2,389	+16.4%
1910	3,231	+35.2%
1950	4,363	+35.0%
1980	7,598	+74.1%
1990	6,915	−9.0%

== Heritage sites of national significance ==
There are five sites in Windisch that are listed as Swiss heritage site of national significance. The oldest is the Celtic/Roman military fort and settlement of Vindonissa. The other large site is the church of the former Königsfelden Abbey with its glass paintings of 1325, Agnes chapel, comptrollery and convent building. The other three are the former Upper Technical School at Klosterzelgstrasse, the former cotton mill Kunz at Alte Spinnerei 4,5 and the psychiatric clinic of Königsfelden. The city hosts a small Roman museum, displaying finds from the military fort of Vindonissa.

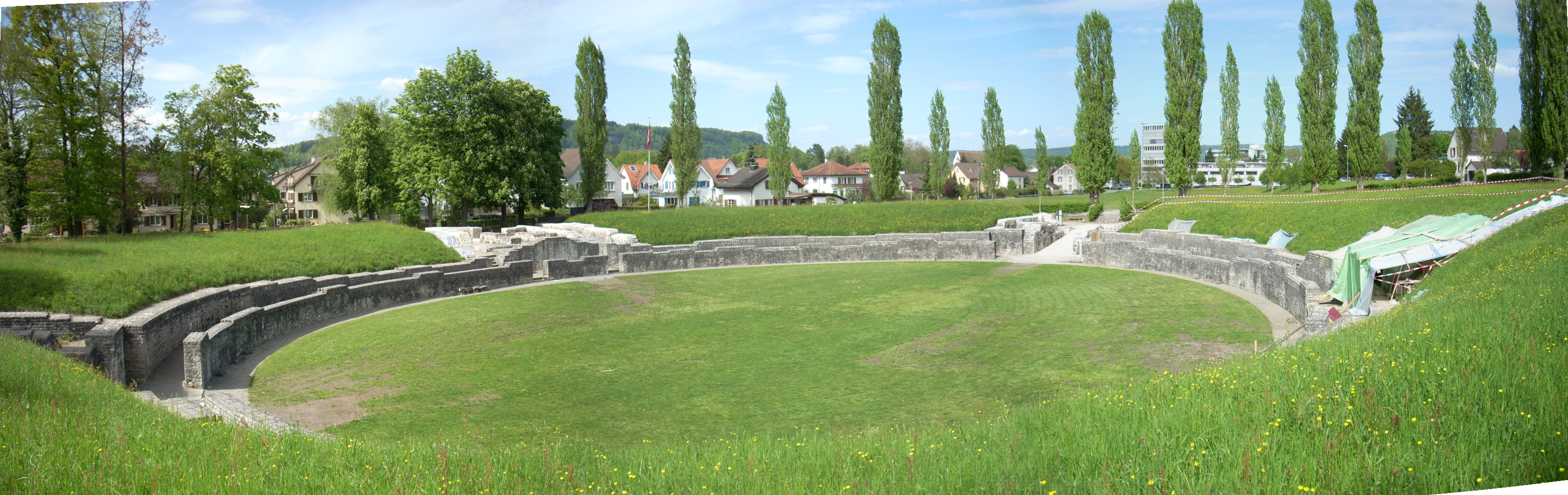
Roman amphitheater of Vindonissa

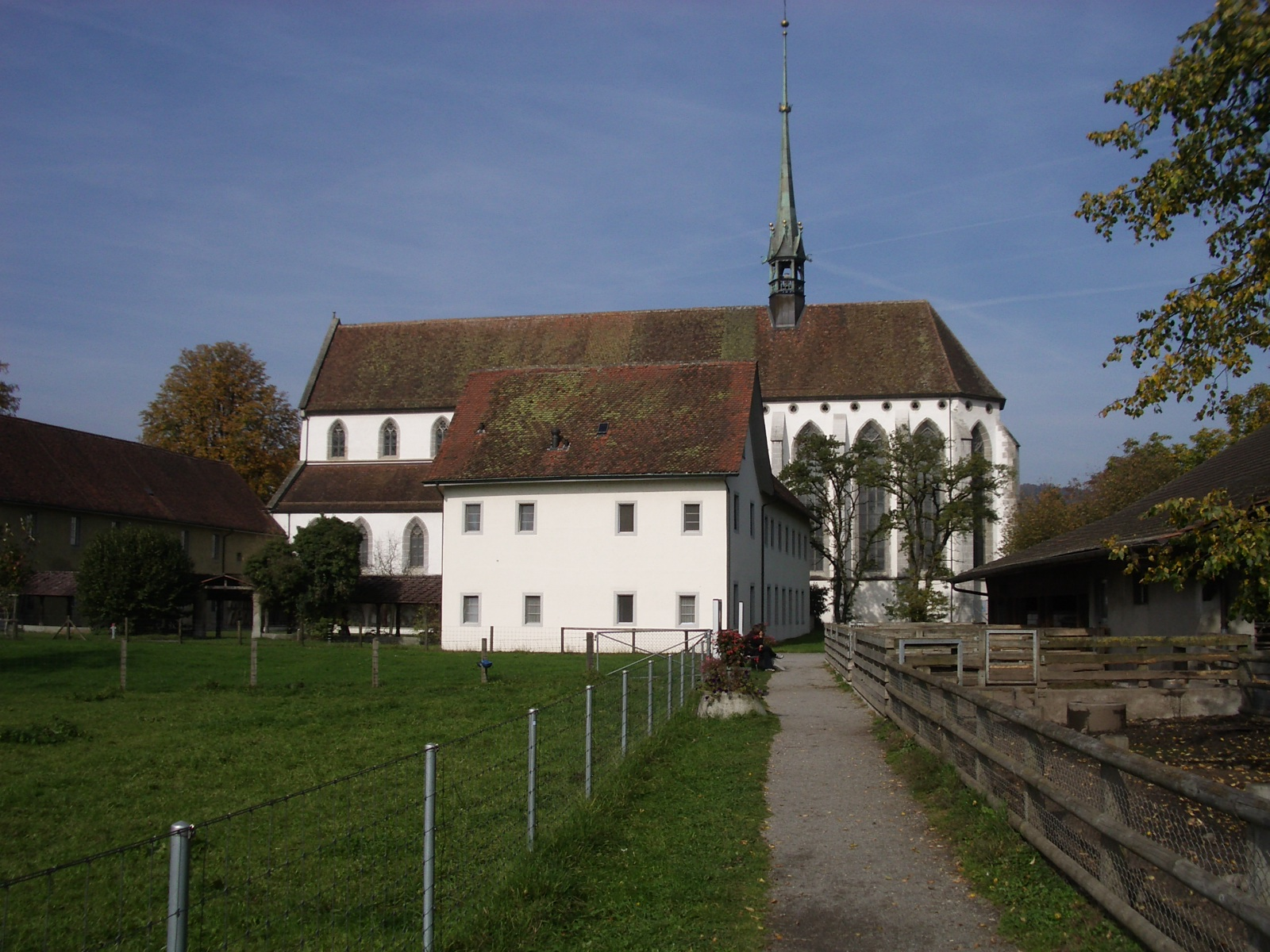
Church of Königsfelden Abbey

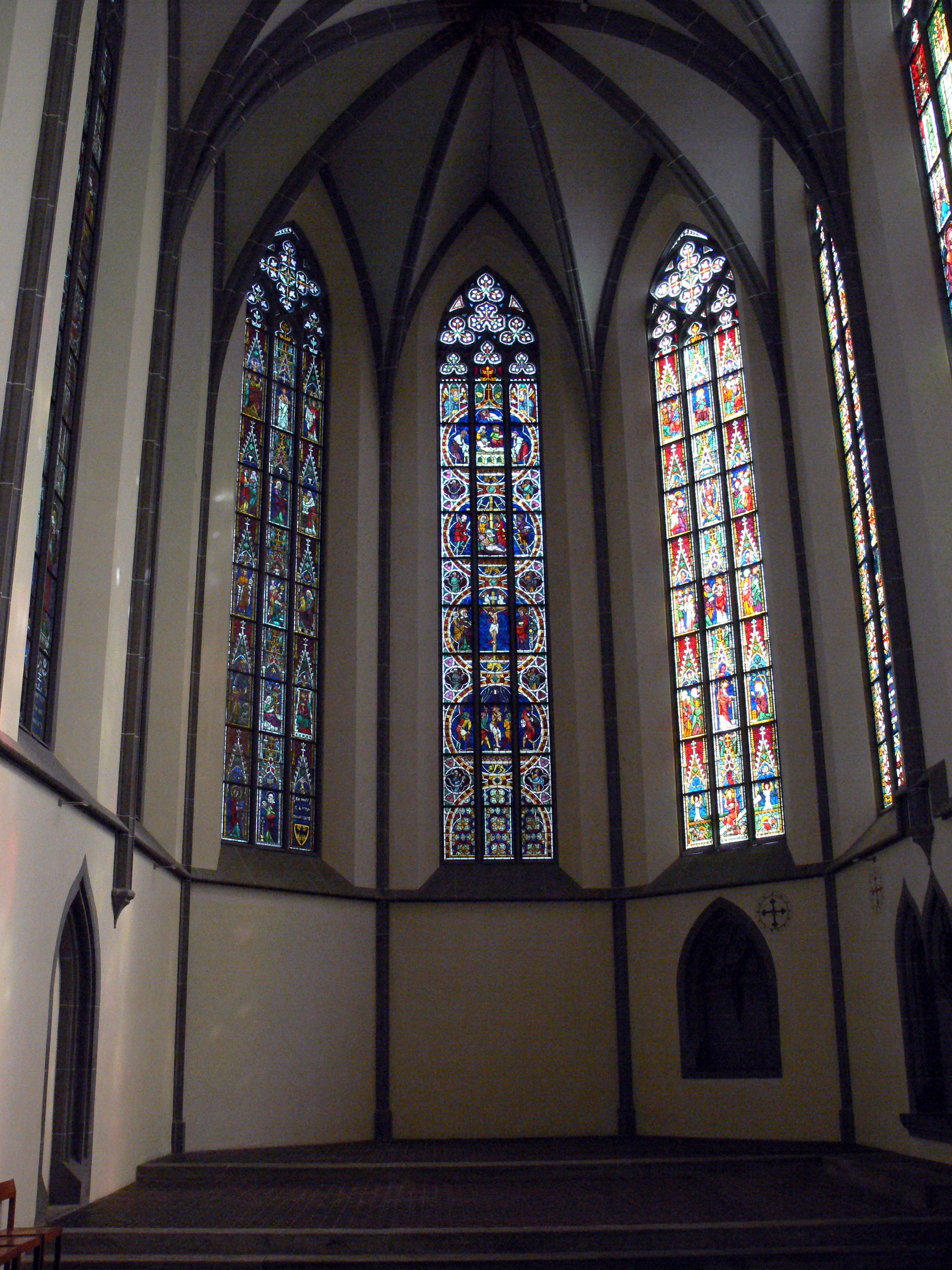
Interior of Königsfelden Abbey Church

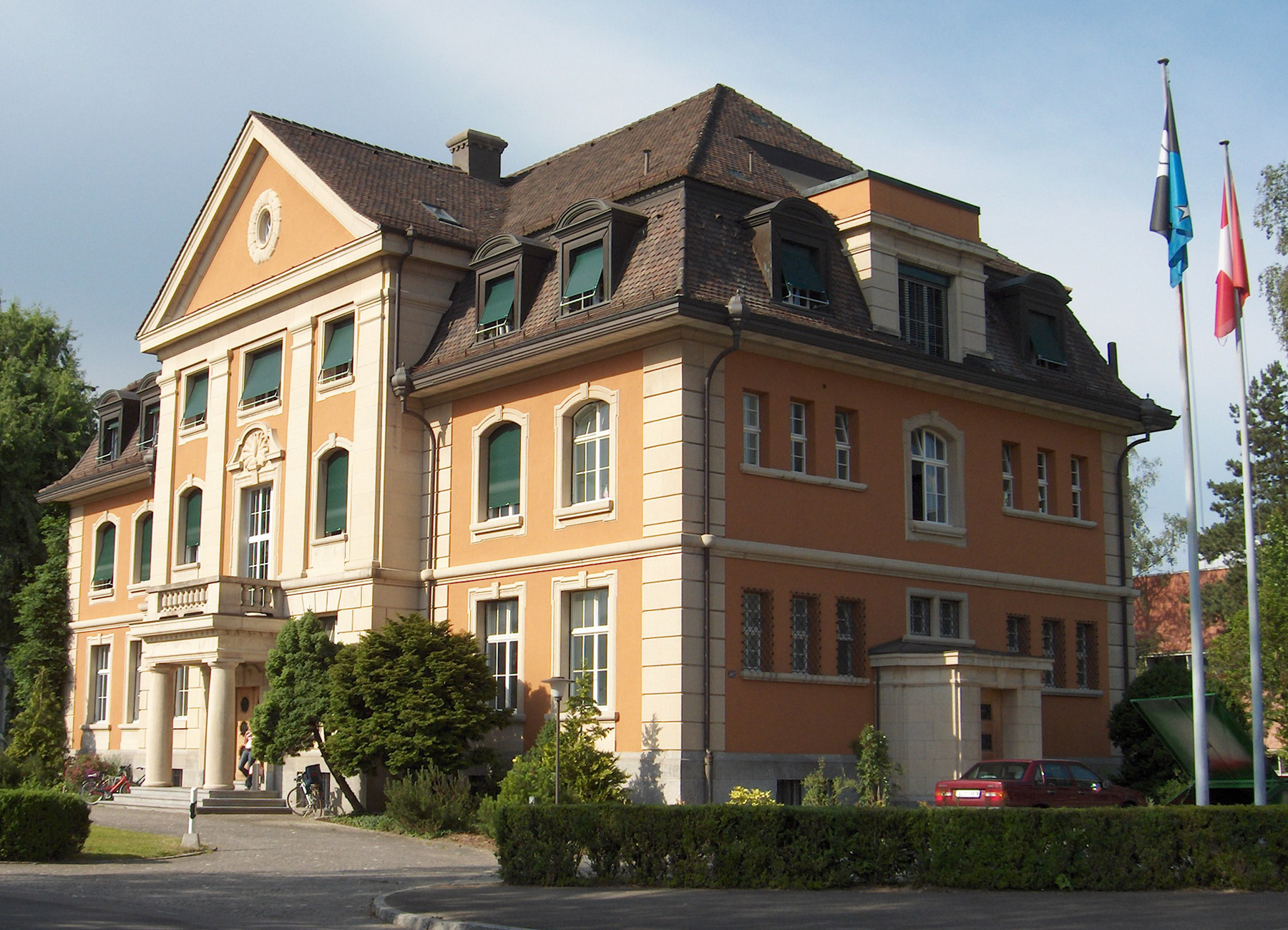
Villa near the Kunz cotton mill

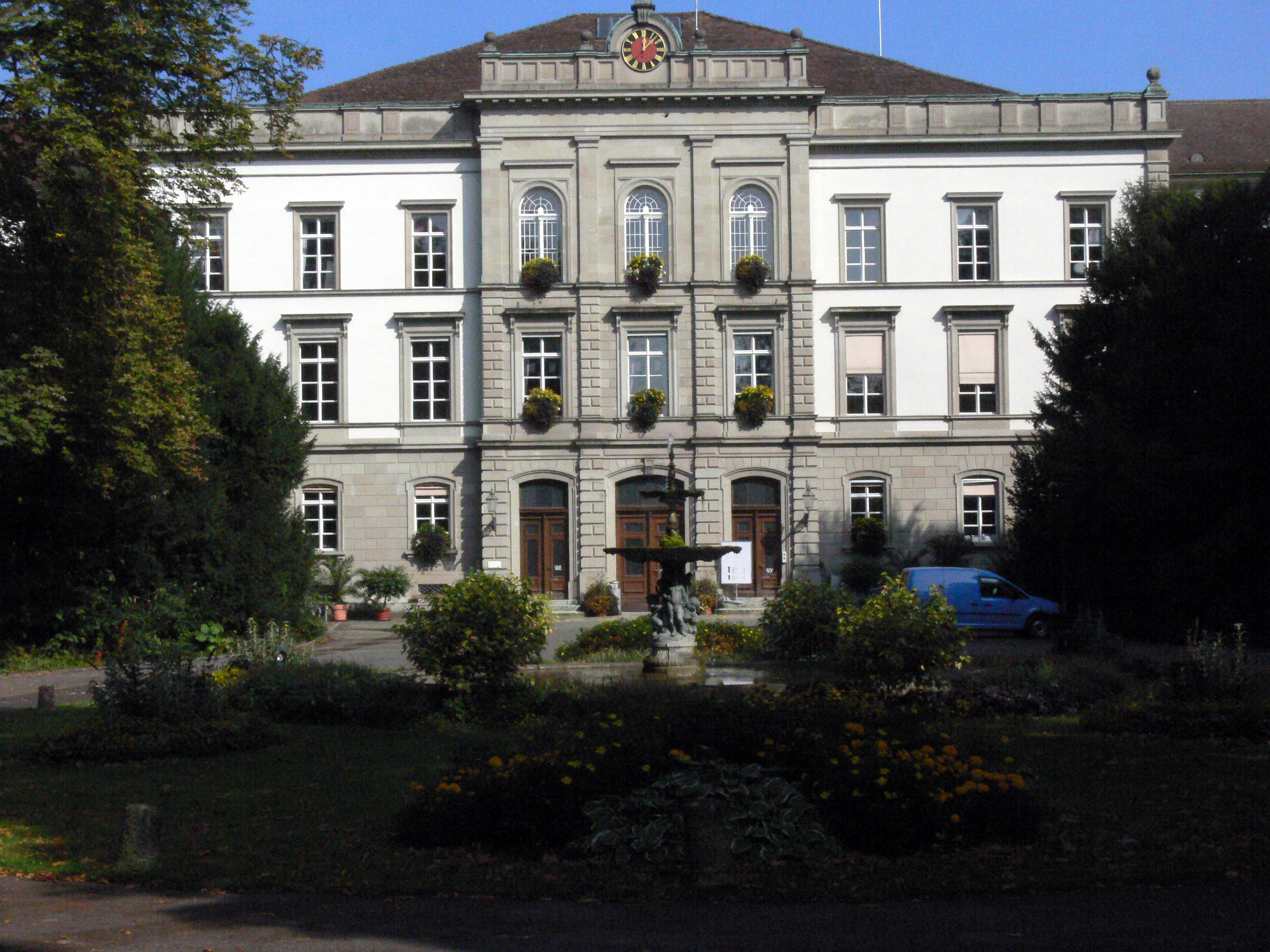
Psychiatric clinic of Königsfelden

== Economy ==
As of 2007, Windisch had an unemployment rate of 2.52%. As of 2005, there were 20 people employed in the primary economic sector and about 9 businesses involved in this sector. 353 people are employed in the secondary sector and there are 46 businesses in this sector. 2,308 people are employed in the tertiary sector, with 195 businesses in this sector.

As of 2000 there was a total of 3,181 workers who lived in the municipality. Of these, 2,446 or about 76.9% of the residents worked outside Windisch while 1,765 people commuted into the municipality for work. There were a total of 2,500 jobs (of at least 6 hours per week) in the municipality. Of the working population, 20.6% used public transportation to get to work, and 39% used a private car.

== Religion ==
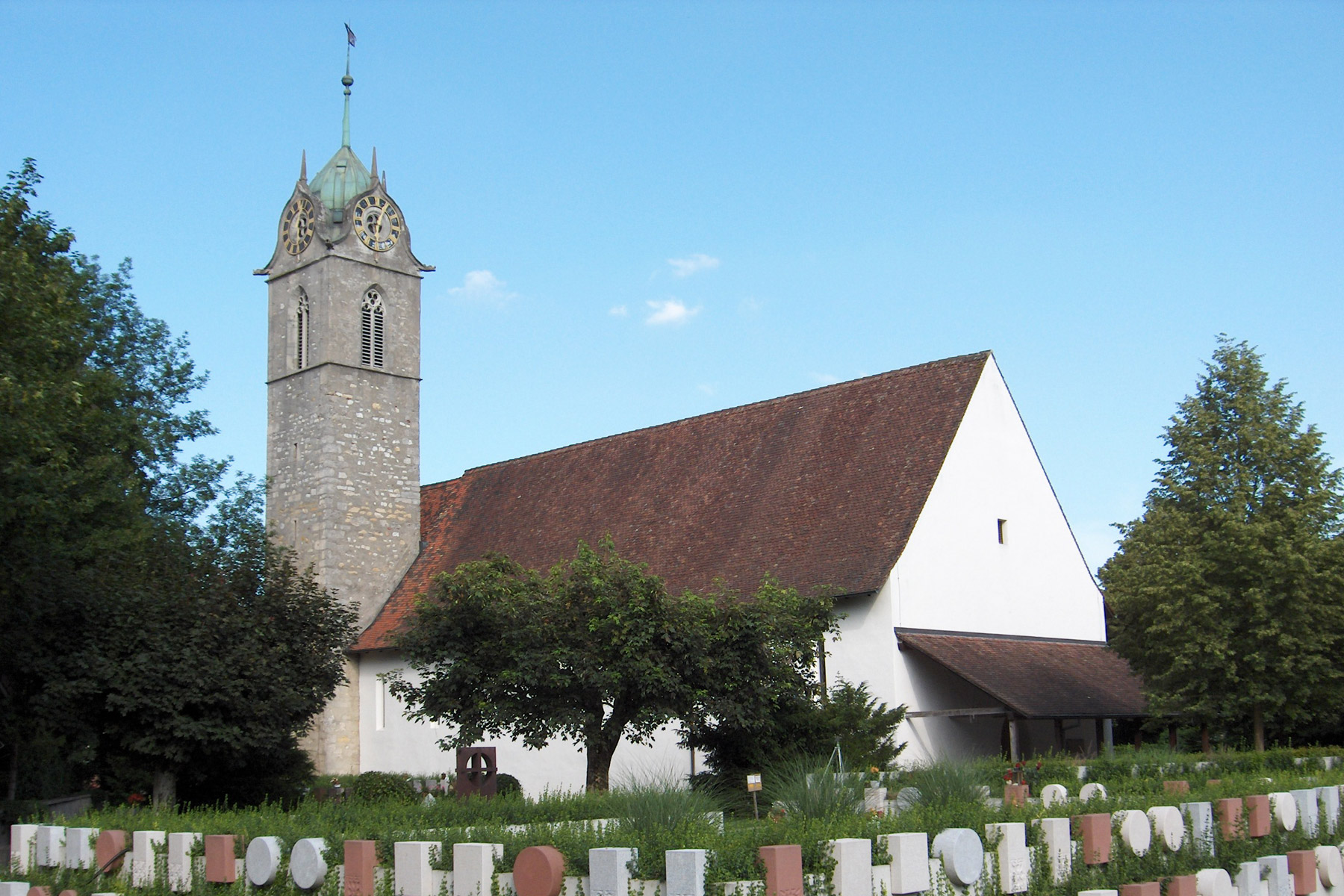
Reformed Church of Windisch

From the 2000 census, 2,288 or 34.4% were Roman Catholic, while 2,252 or 33.9% belonged to the Swiss Reformed Church. Of the rest of the population, there were 5 individuals (or about 0.08% of the population) who belonged to the Christian Catholic faith.

== References and notes ==
=== Secondary sources ===
- De Breffny, Brian, ed. (1983). Ireland: A Cultural Encyclopedia (First ed.). Facts on File, NY. ISBN 0871962608.
