= Catherine of Austria, Duchess of Calabria =

Duchess of Calabria (1295–1323)

Catherine of Austria
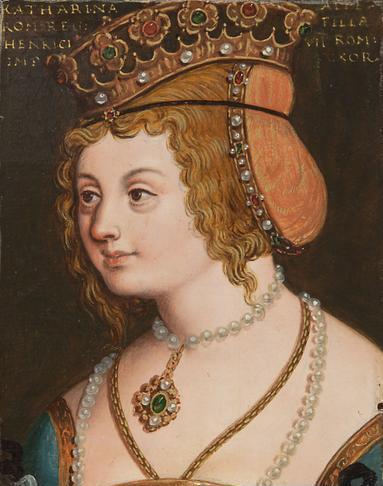
- Posthumous portrait by Anton Boys

Duchess of Calabria
- Tenure: 1316–1323
- Born: 1295; Vienna, Austria
- Died: 18 January 1323 (aged 27–28); Naples
- Burial: San Lorenzo Maggiore, Naples
- Spouse: Charles, Duke of Calabria
- House: House of Habsburg
- Father: Albert I of Germany
- Mother: Elisabeth of Tirol

Catherine of Austria (1295, Vienna, Austria – 18 January 1323, Naples) was a daughter of Albert I of Germany and his wife Elisabeth of Tirol. She was a member of the powerful House of Habsburg. She was Duchess of Calabria by her marriage.

== Life ==
Catherine was betrothed twice before she was married. Her first betrothal is referred to in the Turin State Archives to Philip I of Piedmont. Philip's first wife Isabella of Villehardouin had separated from him due to political reasons so Philip was free to remarry. However, the union between Catherine and Philip was dissolved. Philip instead married Catherine de la Tour du Pin.

Catherine may have been betrothed to someone from the Duchy of Brabant, possibly John II, Duke of Brabant. If this betrothal did take place, it was quickly dissolved by Catherine's brothers because their father had been murdered and had been succeeded by Henry of Luxembourg as Henry VII, Holy Roman Emperor. The brothers' plan was to marry off their sister to the Emperor in order to create an alliance with him. However, only one year after becoming emperor, Henry died without marrying Catherine.

Catherine was finally married aged twenty-one in 1316 to Charles, Duke of Calabria. However the marriage that Catherine and her family had waited for did not last for very long. The couple were married for seven childless years before Catherine died in Naples on 18 January 1323. She was buried in the church of San Lorenzo Maggiore, Naples.

After Catherine's death, Charles remarried to Marie of Valois, who became mother of Joanna I of Naples.

== Ancestry ==
Ancestors of Catherine of Austria, Duchess of Calabria

16. Rudolph II, Count of Habsburg
8. Albert IV, Count of Habsburg
17. Agnes of Staufen
4. Rudolf I of Germany
18. Ulrich, Count of Kiburg and Dillingen
9. Heilwig of Kiburg
19. Anna von Zähringen
2. Albert I of Germany
20. Burckhard IV, Count of Hohenburg
10. Burckhard V, Count of Hohenburg
5. Gertrude of Hohenberg
22. Rudolph II, Count Palatine of Tübingen
11. Mechtild of Tübingen
1. Catherine of Austria
24. Engelbert III, Count of Gorizia
12. Meinhard I of Gorizia-Tyrol
25. Matilda of Andechs
6. Meinhard, Duke of Carinthia
26. Albert IV, Count of Tyrol
13. Adelaide of Tyrol
27. Uta of Frontenhausen
3. Elisabeth of Tirol
28. Louis I, Duke of Bavaria
14. Otto II Wittelsbach, Duke of Bavaria
29. Ludmilla of Bohemia
7. Elisabeth of Bavaria
30. Henry V, Count Palatine of the Rhine
15. Agnes of the Palatinate
31. Agnes of Hohenstaufen
