= Königsfelden Monastery =

Coordinates: 47°28′49″N 8°13′5″E

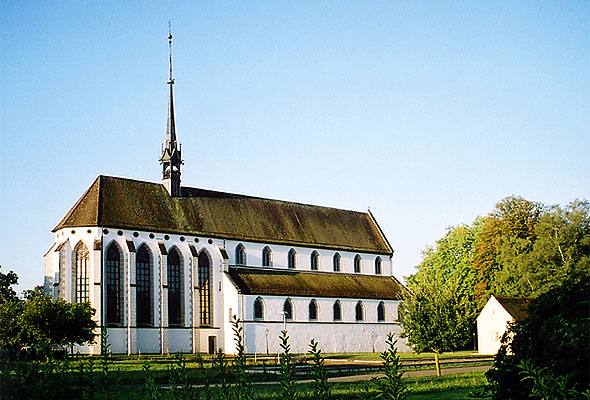
Königsfelden Monastery church

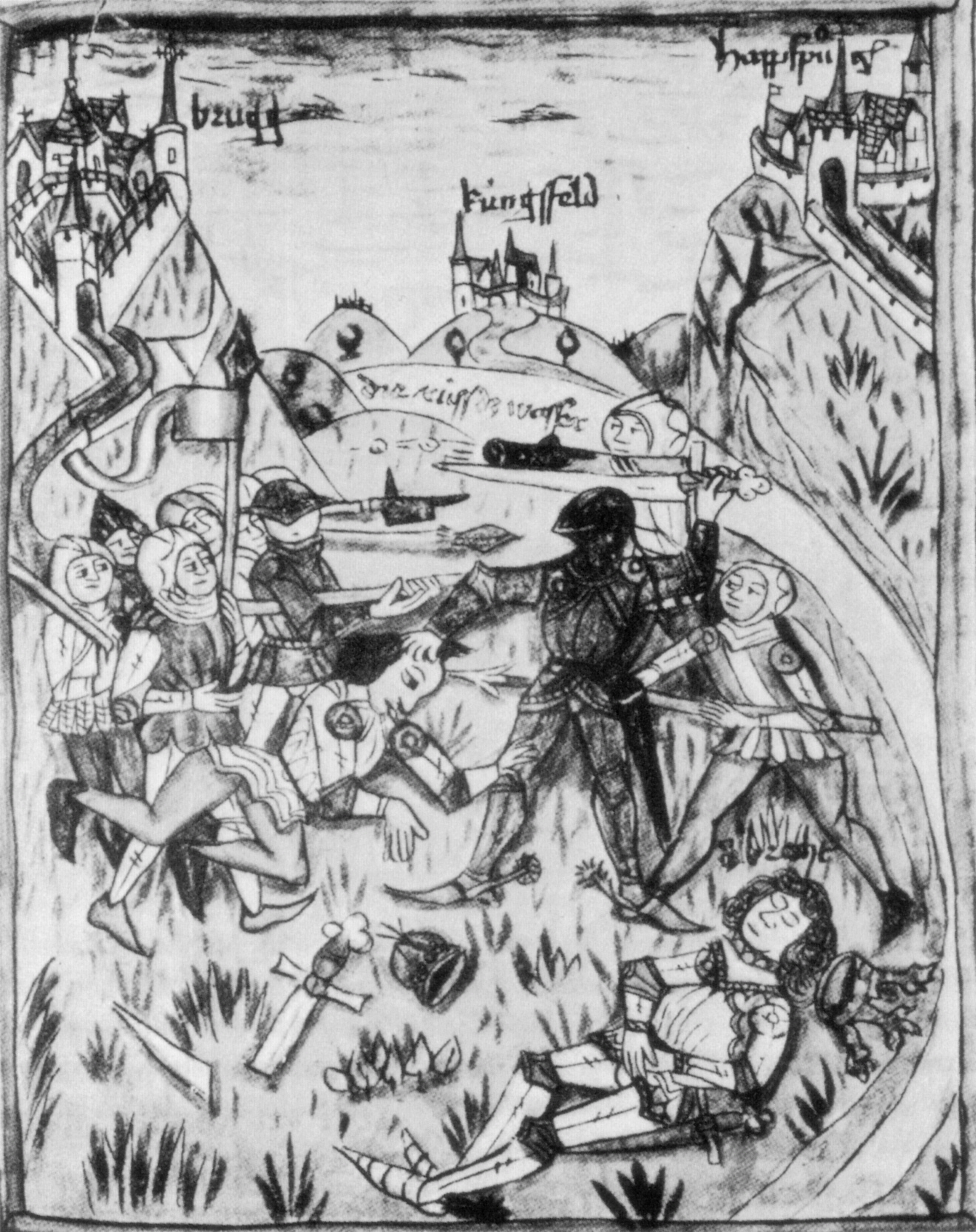
Murder of Albert I, Illustration from the 15th Century

Königsfelden Monastery is a former Franciscan double monastery, which housed both a community of Poor Clare nuns and one of Franciscan friars, living in separate wings, in the municipality of Windisch in the canton of Aargau in Switzerland. It was founded in 1308 by the Habsburgs. In the course of the Protestant Reformation in Switzerland in 1528 it was secularized, and the complex was then the residence of the bailiffs of Bern.

Since 1868 the former monastic buildings have served as a psychiatric clinic. The monastery church was converted into a museum in 2009. It contains a set of 14th-century stained glass windows which, together with the windows in the Cathedral of Bern, are considered the most valuable in Switzerland.

Aerial view (1949)

== History ==
On May 1, 1308, King Albert I of Germany was murdered by his nephew John Parricida in the community of Windisch. In memory of this event his widow, Elizabeth of Carinthia, founded the monastery about 1310-11 at the site, approximately 200 meters (660 ft) from Brugg. The monastic complex centered around the contemplative life of the nuns, while the small community of friars tended to both their spiritual needs and that of the surrounding community.

Albert and Elisabeth’s oldest daughter, Agnes of Austria, the widow of King Andrew III of Hungary, moved to Königsfelden in 1317 and helped it to thrive, but did not join the monastery.

With the conquest of the Western Aargau by the city of Bern, the monastery lost its connection with the Habsburg family. It was abolished in the course of the success of the Reformation in Switzerland in 1528. The complex then served as the seat of the Bernese bailiffs of the Königsfelden district, a steward took over the administration of former monastic property.

In 1804 the former monastery became the property of the canton of Aargau, which had been founded in the year before. The new canton established a mental hospital. In 1872 a new building was built and since 1887 it has been a psychiatric clinic. During the construction a large part of the Franciscan monastery was demolished.

== Abbesses ==
- 1310–1313 Elizabeth of Carinthia
- about 1313 Hedwiga von Kuntzlau
- 1318–1324 Guta von Bachenstein
- 1329 Benigna von Bachenstein
- about 1330 Agnes of Austria
- about 1334 Adelheid I
- about 1355 Elisabeth I von Leiningen
- about 1371 Anna I von Goldenberg
- 1374–1383 Irmengard von Hohenberg
- about 1405 Adelheid II von Hallwyl
- 1406–1408 Margaretha I von Wachingen
- 1411–1415 Margaretha II von Grünenberg
- 1416–1456 Elisabeth II von Leiningen
- about 1456 Ursula von Mirlingen
- about 1459 Eva von Erpach
- about 1471 Osanna Jäger
- 1472–1492 Apollonia von Hohenberg
- 1497–1506 Anna II von Stein
- 1511–1513 Emerita Lutschern
- 1516–1528 Katherina von Waldburg

== Burials ==
- Elizabeth of Carinthia, Queen of the Romans
- Leopold the Glorious, Duke of Austria, and his wife, Catherine of Savoy
- Henry the Friendly and his wife, Elizabeth of Virneburg
- Agnes of Austria, Queen of Hungary
- Elizabeth of Austria, Duchess of Lorraine
- Jutta of Austria, Countess of Öttingen
