= Anne of Bohemia, Duchess of Austria =

Anne of Bohemia
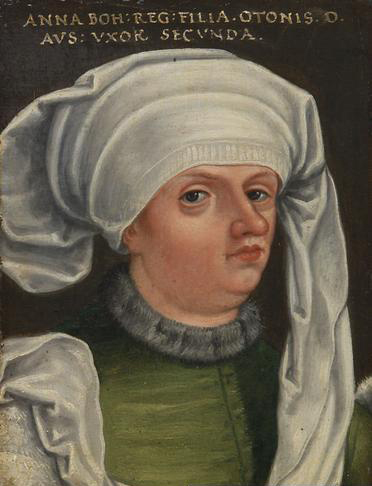
- Portrait by Anton Boys.

Duchess consort of Austria
- Tenure: 16 February 1335 - 3 September 1338
- Born: 27 March 1323; Cham, Germany
- Died: 3 September 1338 (aged 15); Neuberg an der Mürz
- Burial: Neuberg Abbey
- Spouse: Otto, Duke of Austria
- House: Luxembourg
- Father: John of Bohemia
- Mother: Elizabeth of Bohemia

Anne of Bohemia (27 March 1323 – 3 September 1338), also known as Anna of Luxembourg, was a daughter of John of Bohemia and his first wife, Elizabeth of Bohemia. Anne was a member of the House of Luxemburg.

== Early life and family ==
Anne and her twin sister Elisabeth were born in 1323 in the small Bavarian border town of Cham, where their mother, Elisabeth of Bohemia, was living in exile. John financially supported his wife and daughters during their exile. Her mother returned to Bohemia in 1325 with Anne (the younger Elizabeth having died in 1324), but never regained her health after the return, dying from tuberculosis in 1330.

Anne was a younger sister of:

- Charles IV, Holy Roman Emperor
- Bonne of Bohemia, first wife of John II of France
- Margaret of Bohemia, wife of Henry XIV, Duke of Bavaria
- John Henry, Margrave of Moravia

After his wife's death John married Beatrice of Bourbon. They had two children, Wenceslaus I, Duke of Luxembourg, and Bonne, who died young.

== Marriage ==
Anne suffered two failed betrothals before her marriage. The first was to Ladislaus of Hungary, son of Charles I of Hungary and Elisabeth of Poland, but Ladislaus died in 1329. If Ladislaus had survived and the pair had married, Anne could have become Queen of Hungary.

She was then betrothed to Louis VI the Roman. This betrothal ended because Louis's father, Louis IV, Holy Roman Emperor, could have been excommunicated by the Pope.

Anne was eventually married on 16 February 1335, to Otto, Duke of Austria. This was a second marriage for Otto; his first wife, Elizabeth of Bavaria, had died after bearing him two sons. Anne was seven years old at the time. The marriage lasted for eight years and resulted in a closer alliance between Anne's father and the Holy Roman Emperor, but Anne died at the age of fifteen in 1338, long before she and Otto could have children. Otto followed her in death shortly thereafter and was succeeded by his sons from his first marriage to Elisabeth of Bavaria.
