= Otto, Duke of Austria =

Duke of Austria and Styria from 1330 to 1339

Otto the Merry
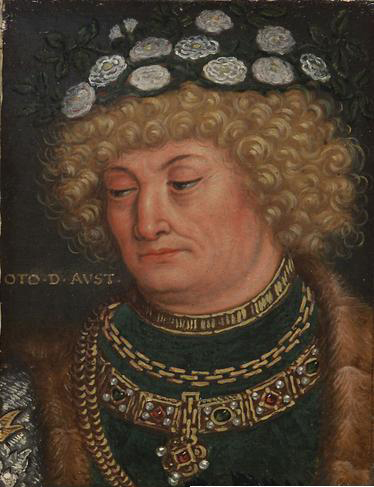
- Portrait by Anton Boys, c. 1580

Duke of Austria and Styria (jointly with Albert II)
- Reign: 1330–1339
- Predecessor: Frederick the Fair
- Successor: Albert II (alone)

Duke of Carinthia (jointly with Albert II)
- Reign: 1335–1339
- Predecessor: Henry of Bohemia
- Successor: Albert II (alone)
- Born: 23 July 1301; Vienna, Austria
- Died: 17 February 1339 (aged 37); Neuberg Abbey, Duchy of Styria
- Spouses: Elizabeth of Bavaria; Anne of Bohemia
- Issue: Frederick II, Duke of Austria; Leopold II, Duke of Austria
- House: Habsburg
- Father: Albert I of Germany
- Mother: Elisabeth of Carinthia

Otto, known as the Merry (German: der Fröhliche; 23 July 1301 – 17 February 1339), was Duke of Austria and Styria from 1330, as well as Duke of Carinthia from 1335 until his death. A member of the House of Habsburg, he ruled jointly with his elder brother Duke Albert II.

== Biography ==
Otto was born in the Austrian capital, Vienna, the youngest son of King Albert I of Germany and Elizabeth of Carinthia, a member of the House of Gorizia-Tyrol (Meinhardiner). His elder brothers were Rudolf III, who became King of Bohemia in 1306, Frederick the Fair, elected King of the Romans in opposition to Louis the Bavarian in 1314, the Austrian dukes Leopold I and Albert II, as well as Henry the Friendly.

After the murder of King Albert I in 1308, the Habsburgs lost out in the struggle for the German throne, when Frederick the Fair was defeated by his Wittelsbach rival Louis in the 1322 Battle of Mühldorf. In the course of a rapprochement of both dynasties, Otto married Elizabeth of Wittelsbach, a daughter of Duke Stephen I of Bavaria. In 1327 he founded Neuberg Abbey in Styria, on the occasion of the birth of his first son Frederick II, and the Chapel of Saint George in the Augustinian Church in Vienna. When his wife Elizabeth died in 1330, she was buried at the Neuberg Abbey church.

From 1329 onwards, Otto administered the original Habsburg possessions in Swabia (Further Austria). In 1330, he and his brother Albert II were enfeoffed with the Austrian duchy. Louis IV, Holy Roman Emperor since 1328, also vested Otto with the title of an Imperial vicar. In February he developed close ties with the mighty House of Luxembourg by secondly marrying Anna of Bohemia, daughter of King John the Blind and sister of future emperor Charles IV, in the Moravian royal city of Znojmo.

Two months later, Otto's maternal uncle, the Meinhardiner duke Henry of Carinthia, died without male heirs, whereupon Emperor Louis IV on 2 May 1335 ceded the Duchy of Carinthia, the adjacent March of Carniola and the southern part of the Tyrol to Otto and Albert as Imperial fiefs in Linz. Otto was enthroned as duke in accordance with the archaic Carantanian rite on the Zollfeld plain, and, from that time onwards, took care of Carinthia rather than of the Austrian duchy. In 1337 he founded the knightly order Societas Templois for the crusade against the pagan Prussian and Lithuanian tribes. His nickname "the Merry" refers to the festive atmosphere at his court.

Otto died at Neuberg Abbey at the age of 37. His sons and titular successors Frederick II and Leopold II died shortly afterwards in 1344 (presumably poisoned), and the line became extinct.

== Marriages and children ==
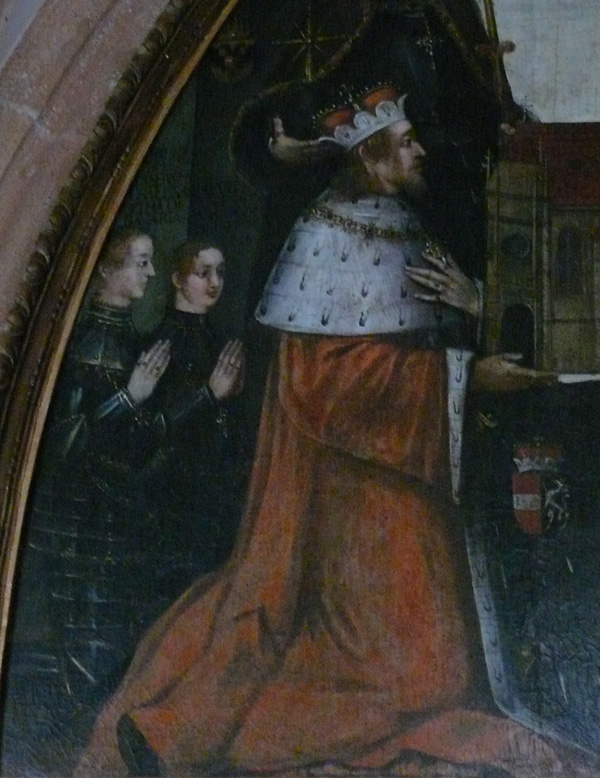
Duke Otto and his two sons, Neuberg Abbey

On 15 May 1325, Otto married his first wife Elizabeth of Bavaria, daughter of Stephen I, Duke of Bavaria, and Jutta of Schweidnitz. They had two sons:

- Frederick II (10 February 1327 – 11 December 1344)
- Leopold II, Duke of Austria (1328 – 10 August 1344)

Elizabeth of Bavaria died on 25 March 1330. Otto remained a widower for almost five years. On 16 February 1335, Otto married his second wife Anna of Luxembourg, daughter of King John of Bohemia and his first wife Elizabeth, a member of the Přemyslid dynasty. They had no children. Anna died on 3 September 1338.

Otto also had four illegitimate sons who appear in genealogies. The identities of their mother or mothers and their later fates are unknown:

- Otto
- Leopold
- Johann
- Leopold

== Male-line family tree ==
House of Habsburg

Original line
Albert; Count of Habsburg c. 1188–1239
Rudolf I of Germany c. 1218–1291
Albert I of Germany; 1255–1308	Hartmann; 1263–1281	Rudolf II; Duke of Austria; 1270–1290
Rudolf I of Bohemia; 1281–1307	Frederick the Fair c. 1289–1330	Leopold I Duke of Austria; 1290–1326	Albert II; Duke of Austria; 1298–1358	Henry the Friendly; 1299–1327	Otto; Duke of Austria; 1301–1339	John; Parricida c. 1290–1312/1313
Albertinian line	Leopoldian line
Rudolf IV; Duke of Austria; 1339–1365	Frederick III; 1347–1362	Albert III; Duke of Austria; 1349–1395	Leopold III; Duke of Austria; 1351–1386	Frederick II; Duke of Austria; 1327–1344	Leopold II; Duke of Austria; 1328–1344
Albert IV; Duke of Austria; 1377–1404	William; Duke of Austria c. 1370–1406	Leopold IV; Duke of Austria; 1371–1411	Ernest; Duke of Austria; 1377–1424	Frederick IV; Duke of Austria; 1382–1439
Albert II of Germany; 1397–1439	Frederick III; HRE; 1415–1493	Albert VI; Archduke of Austria; 1418–1463	Sigismund; Archduke of Austria; 1427–1496
Ladislaus the Posthumous; 1440–1457	Maximilian I HRE; 1459–1519
Philip I of Castile; 1478–1506
Spanish / Iberian line	Austrian / HRE line
Charles V HRE; 1500–1558	Ferdinand I HRE; 1503–1564
Philip II of Spain; 1527–1598	Maximilian II; HRE; 1527–1576	Ferdinand II; Archduke of Austria; 1529–1595	Charles II; Archduke of Austria; 1540–1590
Carlos; Prince of Asturias; 1545–1568	Philip III of Spain; 1578–1621	Rudolf II; HRE; 1552–1612	Ernest of Austria; 1553–1595	Matthias; HRE; 1557–1619	Maximilian III; Archduke of Austria; 1558–1618	Albert VII; Archduke of Austria; 1559–1621	Wenceslaus; Archduke of Austria; 1561–1578	Andrew; Margrave of Burgau; 1558–1600	Charles; Margrave of Burgau; 1560–1618	Ferdinand II; HRE; 1578–1637	Maximilian Ernest of Austria; 1583–1616	Leopold V Archduke of Austria; 1586–1632	Charles of Austria; 1590–1624
Philip IV of Spain; 1605–1665	Charles of Austria; 1607–1632	Ferdinand of Austria; 1609–1641	John-Charles of Austria; 1605–1619	Ferdinand III; HRE; 1608–1657	Leopold Wilhelm of Austria; 1614–1662	Ferdinand Charles; Archduke of Austria; 1628–1662	Sigismund Francis; Archduke of Austria; 1630–1665
Balthasar Charles; Prince of Asturias; 1629–1646	Charles II of Spain; 1661–1700	Ferdinand IV; King of the Romans; 1633–1654	Leopold I HRE; 1640–1705	Charles Joseph of Austria; 1649–1664
Joseph I HRE; 1678–1711	Charles VI; HRE; 1685–1740
Lorraine
Maria Theresa; HRE; 1740–1780	Francis I HRE; 1745–1765
Habsburg-Lorraine
Joseph II; HRE; 1765–1790	Leopold II; HRE; 1790–1792
Francis II; HRE; 1792–1806

Notes:

Otto, Duke of Austria House of Habsburg Born: 23 July 1301 Died: 17 February 1339
Preceded by Frederick I	Duke of Austria and Styria; Count of Habsburg jointly with Albert II/VI; 1330–1339	Succeeded by Albert II/VI (alone)
Preceded by Henry VI	Duke of Carinthia jointly with Albert II; 1335–1339	Succeeded by Albert II/VI (alone)
