= Herman, Margrave of Brandenburg-Salzwedel =

Margrave and co-ruler of Brandenburg (died 1308)

Herman the Tall
- Margrave of Brandenburg-Salzwedel
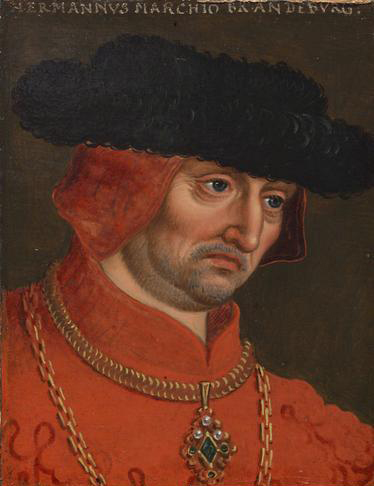
- Herman, Margrave of Brandenburg-Salzwedel by Anton Boys
- Born: c. 1275
- Died: 1 February 1308; Lübz, Duchy of Mecklenburg, Holy Roman Empire
- Buried: Lehnin Abbey
- Noble family: House of Ascania
- Spouse: Anne of Austria
- Father: Otto V, Margrave of Brandenburg-Salzwedel
- Mother: Judith of Henneberg-Coburg

Herman, Margrave of Brandenburg, also known as Herman the Tall (c. 1275 – 1 February 1308), a member of the House of Ascania, was Margrave and co-ruler of Brandenburg with his cousin Margrave Otto IV of Brandenburg-Stendal.

== Life ==
Herman was the son of Margrave Otto V of Brandenburg-Salzwedel and his wife Judith, daughter of the Franconian count Herman I of Henneberg. In 1299, he succeeded his father as co-regent of Brandenburg, which he ruled jointly with his cousin Otto IV. After the death of the Piast duke Bolko I of Jawor, he exercised the guardianship over Bolko's children.

In 1308, war broke out between Brandenburg and the Duchy of Mecklenburg, the so-called North German Margrave War. Herman and Otto invaded Mecklenburg and Herman died during the siege of Lübz. He was buried in the Lehnin Abbey.

== Marriage and issue ==
In 1295 he married Anne of Austria (1280-1327), the daughter of the late Habsburg king Albert I of Germany. They had four children:

- Judith (Jutta) (1297-1353), heiress of Coburg, married to Count Henry VIII of Henneberg (d. 1347)
- John V (1302-1317), his successor
- Matilda (d. 1323), heiress of Lower Lusatia, married Duke Henry IV "the Faithful" of Glogau (d. 1342)
- Agnes (1297-1334), heiress of the Altmark, married Waldemar, Margrave of Brandenburg (1281-1381). In 1319, she married her second husband, Duke Otto of Brunswick-Lüneburg, Prince of Göttingen (1290-1344).

Herman, Margrave of Brandenburg-Salzwedel House of Ascania Born: c. 1275 Died: 1 February 1308
Preceded by Otto V	Margrave of Brandenburg-Salzwedel; 1299–1308	Succeeded by John V
