= Anne of Austria, Margravine of Brandenburg =

Margravine of Brandenburg-Salzwedel

Anna of Austria
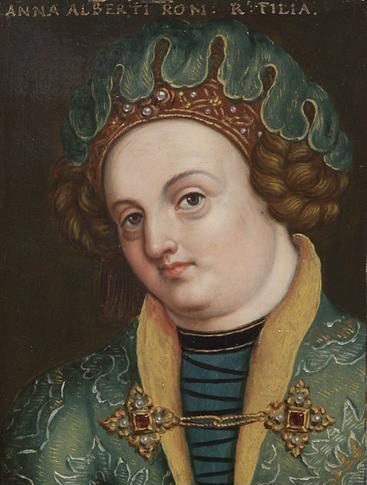
- Posthumous portrait by Anton Boys

Margravine consort of Brandenburg
- Tenure: 1295–1327
- Born: 1275; Vienna, Austria
- Died: 1327 (aged 51–52); Legnica
- Spouse: Herman, Margrave of Brandenburg-Salzwedel; Henry VI the Good
- Issue: Judith, Count of Henneberg; John V, Margrave of Brandenburg-Salzwedel; Matilde, Duchess of Greater Poland; Agnes, Margravine of Brandenburg; Elisabeth, Duchess of Oleśnica; Euphemia; Margaret
- House: House of Habsburg
- Father: Albert I of Germany
- Mother: Elisabeth of Tirol

Anna of Austria (1275, Vienna, Austria – 1327, Legnica) was a daughter of Albert I of Germany and Elisabeth of Tirol. She was a member of the House of Habsburg.

== First marriage ==
Anna first married in 1295 in Graz. Her husband was Herman, Margrave of Brandenburg-Salzwedel. They had four children:

- Jutta of Brandenburg (1297–1353), heiress of Coburg, married to Count Henry VIII of Henneberg
- John (1302–1317), succeeded his father, but died young in 1317. With his death, the Brandenburg-Salzwedel line of the House of Ascania died out.
- Matilde of Brandenburg (died 1323) married Henry IV the Faithful
- Agnes of Brandenburg (1297–1334), heiress of the Altmark, married with margrave Waldemar of Brandenburg (1281–1381) and in 1319 to Duke Otto of Brunswick-Göttingen (1290–1344).

In 1308, Herman died, and their son John succeeded him.

== Second marriage ==
In 1310 Anna married Henry VI the Good, Duke of Wrocław, son of Henry V the Fat and his wife Elisabeth of Greater Poland. They had three daughters:

- Elisabeth of Brieg (ca. 1311 – 20 February? 1328), married before 10 January 1322 to Duke Konrad I of Oleśnica.
- Euphemia of Brieg (Ofka) (ca. 1312 – 21 March after 1384), married before 29 November 1325 to Duke Bolesław the Elder of Niemodlin (Falkenberg).
- Margaret of Brieg (ca. 1313 – 8 March 1379), Abbess of St. Clara in Wrocław (1359).

Anna died in 1327 in Legnica. When Henry died ten years later without any male heirs, Wrocław was merged with the Bohemian crown.
