= Frederick IV of Lorraine =

Duke of Lorraine from 1312 to 1328

Frederick IV
- Duke of Lorraine
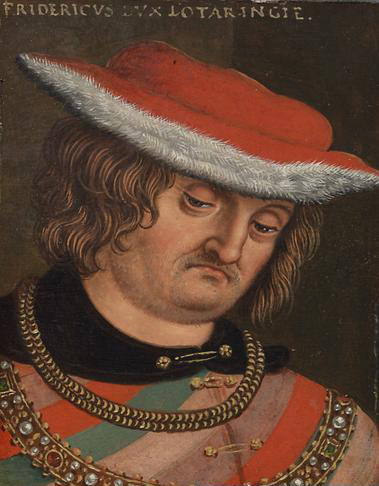
- Frederick IV by Anton Boys
- Born: 15 April 1282
- Died: 23 August 1328 (age 46)
- Spouse: Elisabeth of Austria (m. 1304)
- Issue: Rudolph; Margaret
- House: House of Lorraine
- Father: Theobald II, Duke of Lorraine
- Mother: Isabella of Rumigny

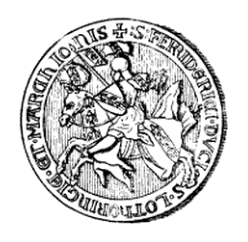

Frederick IV (French: Ferry) (15 April 1282 – 23 August 1328), called the Fighter, was the Duke of Lorraine from 1312 to his death in 1328.

== Biography ==
Frederick was born in Gondreville, the son and successor of Theobald II and Isabella of Rumigny.

On 18 October 1314, at the Diet of Frankfurt, the prince-electors of the Holy Roman Empire failed to elect as successor to Henry VII, Holy Roman Emperor, either the Habsburg claimant, Frederick the Handsome, the duke of Austria, or the Wittelsbach, Louis IV of Bavaria. By marriage to Elisabeth, daughter of Albert I of Germany, Frederick was the brother-in-law of Frederick the Handsome, called Frederick III of Germany by his supporters, of whom Frederick of Lorraine was one. On 28 September 1322, at the Battle of Mühldorf, both Fredericks were captured. This was an opportunity for Charles IV of France to strengthen the Lorrainer ties to France and he quickly procured the duke's release on the promise that Lorraine would not interfere in imperial affairs.

In 1324, he participated in an expedition in Aquitaine against Edward II of England's estates, for Charles IV had built a fortress illegally on Edward's territory and had sent his uncle, Count Charles III of Valois, against the English possessions after Hugh le Despenser and the Younger Despenser imprisoned Isabella of France, Charles IV's sister and Edward's queen. He took part in the War of Metz in 1325 and 1326. He joined Philip VI of France, on his succession in 1328, and fought and died at the Battle of Cassel.

== Personal life ==
In 1304, Frederick IV married Elisabeth of Austria (1285–1352), daughter of Albert I of Austria the Emperor. They had the following children:

- Rudolph (1320–1346), his successor in Lorraine
- Margaret, married Jean de Chalon, lord of Auberive (died 1350), then Conrad, count of Freiburg, and lastly Ulrich (died 1377), lord of Rappoltstein
- Four children who died during childhood

== See also ==
- Dukes of Lorraine family tree

== Sources ==
- Bogdan, Henry (2007). La Lorraine des ducs (in French). Perrin.
- George, Hereford Brooke (1875). Genealogical Tables Illustrative of Modern History. Oxford at the Clarendon Press.

Preceded by Theobald II	Duke of Lorraine; 1312–1328	Succeeded by Rudolph
