= Henry the Friendly =

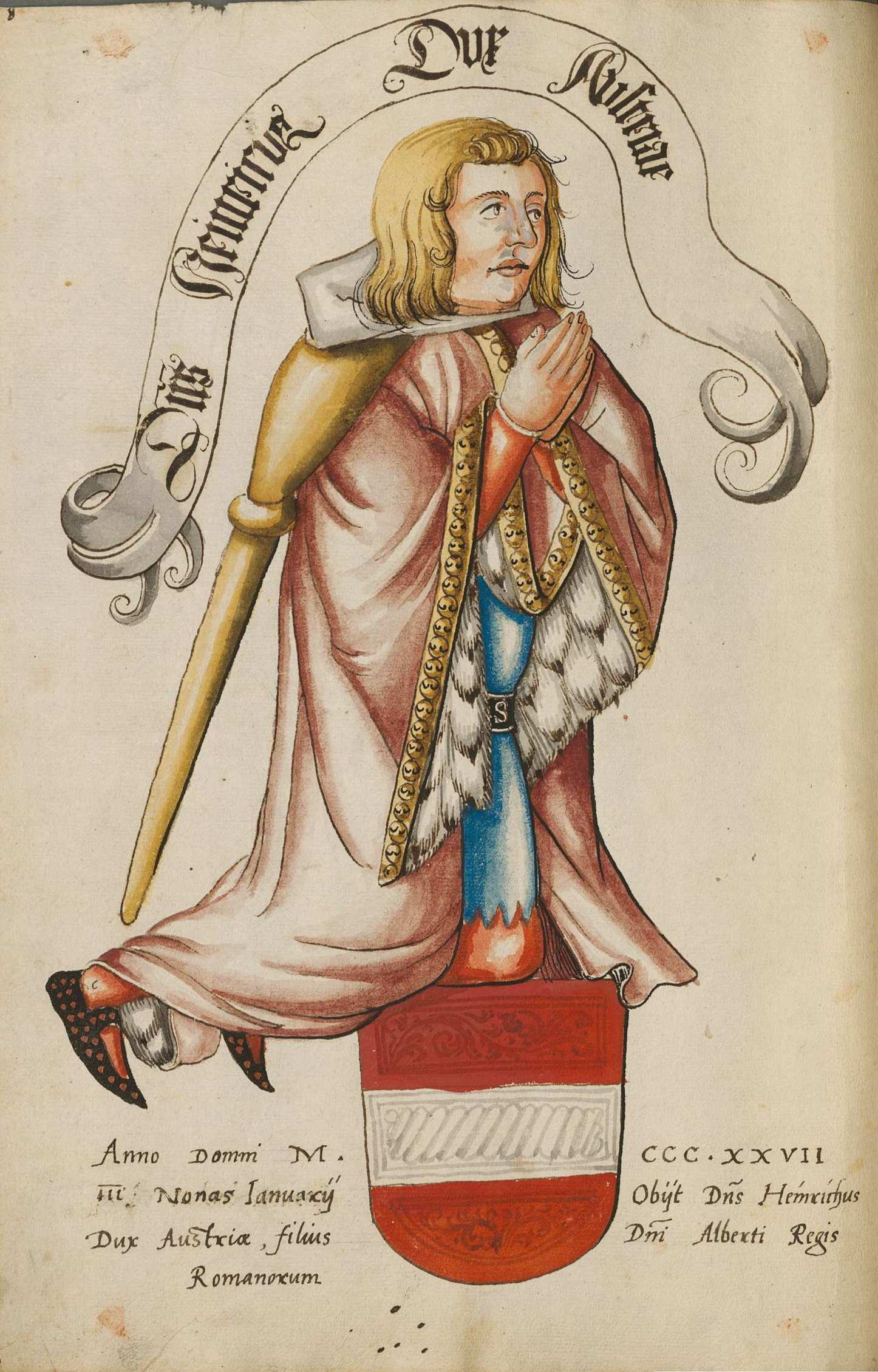
- An idealised representation of Henry the Friendly
- Born: 15 May 1299
- Died: 3 February 1327 (aged 27)
- Spouse: Elizabeth of Virneburg
- House: House of Habsburg
- Father: Albert I of Germany
- Mother: Elizabeth of Carinthia

Henry of Austria (15 May 1299 – 3 February 1327), known as Henry the Friendly, was the son of King Albert I of Germany and Elisabeth of Gorizia-Tyrol.

In 1305, Henry was betrothed to his stepniece, Elizabeth of Hungary, the engagement probably being arranged by Agnes, dowager queen of Hungary, who showed great affection for Henry. However, the marriage never took place. In 1314, Duke Henry married Countess Elizabeth of Virneburg. The marriage remained childless.

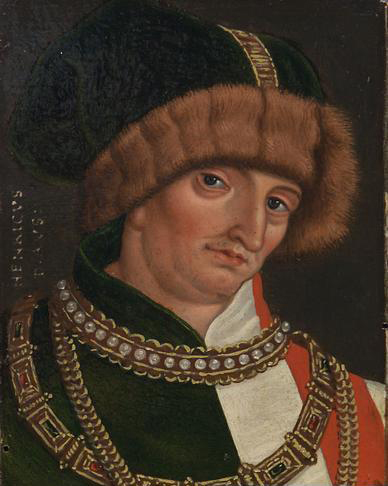
Henry the Friendly

Henry helped his brother, Frederick the Fair, in his fight for the German throne. After the Battle of Mühldorf on 28 September 1322, Henry, King Frederick and 1,300 other Austrian nobles were taken prisoners. Henry spent several years in the Bohemian castle Biirglitz before being released for a ransom of 3,000 ducats and the cession of his rights to Znojmo, Castell, Laa and Weitra. Exhausted by the harsh prison conditions, Henry died at the age of 27. His widow had him buried at Königsfelden Abbey, along with several members of his immediate family.
