= Albert I of Germany =

King of Germany from 1298 to 1308

Albert I
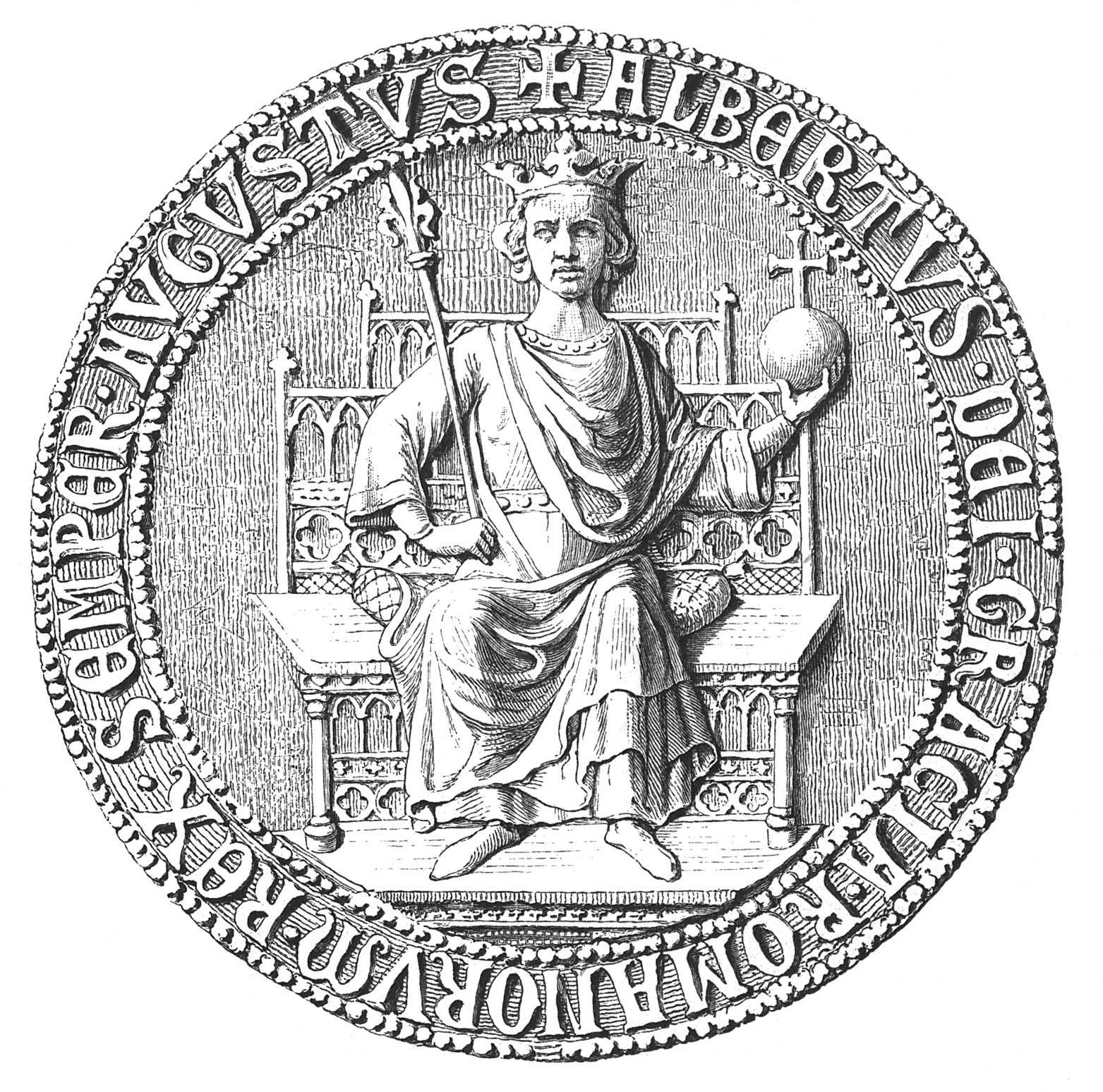
- Seal of Albert I, inscribed in Latin: Albertus Dei gratia Romanorum rex semper augustus ('Albert by the grace of God King of the Romans, ever majestic')

King of Germany (formally King of the Romans)
- Reign: 27 July 1298 – 1 May 1308
- Coronation: 24 August 1298; Aachen Cathedral
- Predecessor: Adolf
- Successor: Henry VII
- Born: July 1255; Imperial City of Rheinfelden
- Died: 1 May 1308 (aged 52); Windisch, Further Austria
- Burial: Speyer Cathedral
- Spouse: Elizabeth of Carinthia
- Issue: Rudolph I, King of Bohemia; Frederick the Fair, King of the Romans; Leopold I, Duke of Austria; Albert II, Duke of Austria; Henry the Gentle; Otto, Duke of Austria; Anna, Margravine of Brandenburg and Duchess of Wrocław; Agnes, Queen of Hungary; Elizabeth, Duchess of Lorraine; Catherine, Duchess of Calabria; Judith, Countess of Öttingen
- House: House of Habsburg
- Father: Rudolph I of Germany
- Mother: Gertrude of Hohenberg

Albert I of Habsburg (German: Albrecht I.) (July 1255 – 1 May 1308) was a Duke of Austria and Styria from 1282 and King of Germany from 1298 until his assassination. He was the eldest son of King Rudolf I of Germany and his first wife Gertrude of Hohenberg. He is sometimes referred to as 'Albert the One-eyed' because of a battle injury that left him with a hollow eye socket and a permanent snarl.

== Biography ==
From 1273 Albert ruled as a landgrave over his father's Swabian (Further Austrian) possessions in Alsace. In 1282 his father, the first German monarch from the House of Habsburg, invested him and his younger brother Rudolf II with the duchies of Austria and Styria, which he had seized from late King Ottokar II of Bohemia and defended in the 1278 Battle on the Marchfeld. By the 1283 Treaty of Rheinfelden his father entrusted Albert with their sole government, while Rudolf II ought to be compensated by the Further Austrian Habsburg home territories – which, however, never happened until his death in 1290. Albert and his Swabian ministeriales appear to have ruled the Austrian and Styrian duchies with conspicuous success, overcoming the resistance by local nobles.

King Rudolf I was unable to secure the succession to the German throne for his son, especially due to the objections raised by Ottokar's son King Wenceslaus II of Bohemia, and the plans to install Albert as successor of the assassinated King Ladislaus IV of Hungary in 1290 also failed. Upon Rudolf's death in 1291, the Prince-electors, fearing Albert's power and the implementation of a hereditary monarchy, chose Count Adolf of Nassau-Weilburg as King of the Romans. An uprising among his Styrian dependents compelled Albert to recognize the sovereignty of his rival and to confine himself for a time to the government of the Habsburg lands at Vienna.

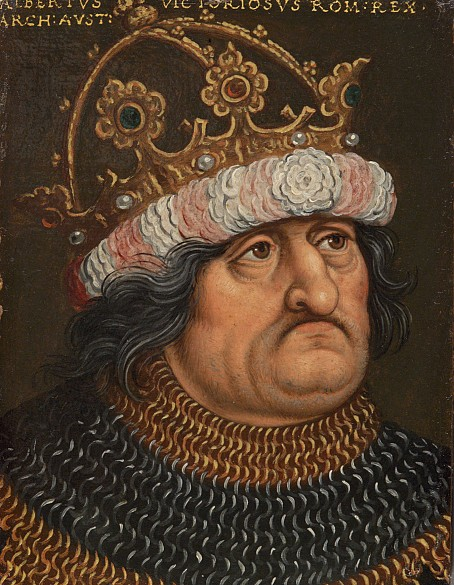
Albrecht I

He did not abandon his hopes of the throne, however, which were eventually realised: In 1298, he was chosen German king by some of the princes, who were bothered about Adolf's attempts to gain his own power bases in the lands of Thuringia and Meissen, again led by the Bohemian king Wenceslaus II. The armies of the rival kings met at the Battle of Göllheim near Worms, where Adolf was defeated and slain.

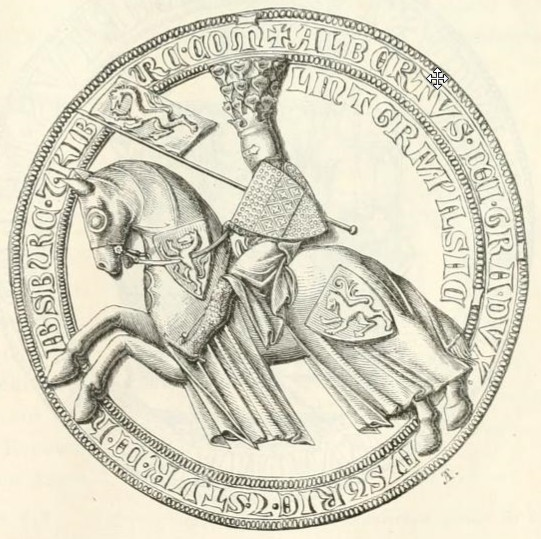
Seal of Albert I of Habsburg; his shield displays the arms of Habsburg (modern) (Babenberg: Gules, a fess argent, here shown decorated with diaper-work) whilst his banner and the shields on his horse's caparison displays Habsburg (ancient) Or, a lion rampant gules crowned armed and langued azure. Latin inscription (abbreviated): Albertus Dei gratia grandis dux Austriae et Styriae de Habsburg et Kiburg comes lantgravus Alsaciae ('Albert by grace of God Grand Duke of Austria and Styria, Count of Habsburg and Kyburg, Landgrave of Alsace'). Atop his helm he displays a crest of A plume of peacock feathers

Submitting to a new election but securing the support of several influential princes by making extensive promises, he was chosen at the Imperial City of Frankfurt on 27 July 1298, and crowned at Aachen Cathedral on 24 August.

Although a hard, stern man, Albert had a keen sense of justice when his own interests were not involved, and few of the German kings possessed so practical an intelligence. He encouraged the cities, and not content with issuing proclamations against private war, formed alliances with the princes in order to enforce his decrees. The serfs, whose wrongs seldom attracted notice in an age indifferent to the claims of common humanity, found a friend in this severe monarch, and he protected even the despised and persecuted Jews. Stories of his cruelty and oppression in the Swiss cantons (cf. William Tell) did not appear until the 16th century, and are now regarded as legendary.

Albert sought to play an important part in European affairs. He seemed at first inclined to press a quarrel with the Kingdom of France over the Burgundian frontier, but the refusal of Pope Boniface VIII to recognize his election led him to change his policy, and, in 1299, he made a treaty with King Philip IV, by which his son Rudolph was to marry Blanche, the King's half-sister. He afterwards became estranged from Philip, but in 1303, Boniface recognized him as German king and future emperor; in return, Albert recognized the authority of the pope alone to bestow the Imperial crown, and promised that none of his sons should be elected German king without papal consent.

Albert had failed in his attempt to seize the counties of Holland and Zeeland, as vacant fiefs of the Holy Roman Empire, on the death of Count John I in 1299, but in 1306 he secured the crown of Bohemia for his son Rudolph III on the death of King Wenceslaus III. He also renewed the claim made by his predecessor, Adolf, on Thuringia, and interfered in a quarrel over the succession to the Hungarian throne. The Thuringian attack ended in Albert's defeat at the Battle of Lucka in 1307 and, in the same year, the death of his son Rudolph weakened his position in eastern Europe. His action in abolishing all tolls established on the Rhine since 1250 led the Rhenish prince-archbishops and the Elector of the Palatinate to form a league against him. Aided by the Imperial cities, however, he soon crushed the rising.

== Death ==
Albert was on the way to suppress a revolt in Swabia when he was murdered on 1 May 1308, at Windisch on the Reuss, by his nephew Duke John, afterwards called "the Parricide" or "John Parricida".

== Titles ==
His full name and titles were: Albert, by the grace of God, King of the Romans, Duke of Austria and Styria, Lord of Carniola, over the Wendish Mark and of Port Naon, Count of Habsburg and Kyburg, Landgrave of Alsace.

== Marriage and children ==
In 1274, Albert had married Elizabeth, daughter of Count Meinhard II of Tyrol, who was a descendant of the Babenberg margraves of Austria who predated the Habsburgs' rule. The baptismal name Leopold, patron saint margrave of Austria, was given to one of their sons. Queen Elizabeth was in fact better connected to mighty German rulers than her husband: she was a descendant of earlier German kings, including Emperor Henry IV; she was also a niece of the Wittelsbach dukes of Bavaria, Austria's important neighbor.

Albert and Elizabeth had twelve children:

1. Anna (1275, Vienna – 19 March 1327, Breslau), married:
  1. in Graz c. 1295 to Herman, Margrave of Brandenburg-Salzwedel;
  2. in Breslau 1310 to Henry VI the Good, Duke of Wrocław.
2. Agnes (18 May 1281 – 10 June 1364, Königsfelden), married in Vienna 13 February 1296 King Andrew III of Hungary.
3. Rudolph III (c. 1282 – 4 July 1307, Horažďovice) married but line extinct and predeceased his father.
4. Elizabeth (1285 – 19 May 1353), married 1304 Frederick IV, Duke of Lorraine.
5. Frederick I (1289 – 13 January 1330, Gutenstein) married to Isabella of Aragon, Queen of Germany but line extinct.
6. Leopold I (4 August 1290 – 28 February 1326, Strassburg) married, had issue.
7. Catherine (1295 – 18 January 1323, Naples), married Charles, Duke of Calabria in 1316.
8. Albert II (12 December 1298, Vienna – 20 July 1358, Vienna).
9. Henry the Gentle (1299 – 3 February 1327, Bruck an der Mur) married but line extinct.
10. Meinhard (1300 – 1301), died in infancy.
11. Otto (23 July 1301, Vienna – 26 February 1339, Vienna) married but line extinct.
12. Jutta (1302 – 5 March 1329), married Ludwig V, Count of Öttingen in Baden, 26 March 1319.

== Male-line family tree ==
House of Habsburg

Original line
Albert; Count of Habsburg c. 1188–1239
Rudolf I of Germany c. 1218–1291
Albert I of Germany; 1255–1308	Hartmann; 1263–1281	Rudolf II; Duke of Austria; 1270–1290
Rudolf I of Bohemia; 1281–1307	Frederick the Fair c. 1289–1330	Leopold I Duke of Austria; 1290–1326	Albert II; Duke of Austria; 1298–1358	Henry the Friendly; 1299–1327	Otto; Duke of Austria; 1301–1339	John; Parricida c. 1290–1312/1313
Albertinian line	Leopoldian line
Rudolf IV; Duke of Austria; 1339–1365	Frederick III; 1347–1362	Albert III; Duke of Austria; 1349–1395	Leopold III; Duke of Austria; 1351–1386	Frederick II; Duke of Austria; 1327–1344	Leopold II; Duke of Austria; 1328–1344
Albert IV; Duke of Austria; 1377–1404	William; Duke of Austria c. 1370–1406	Leopold IV; Duke of Austria; 1371–1411	Ernest; Duke of Austria; 1377–1424	Frederick IV; Duke of Austria; 1382–1439
Albert II of Germany; 1397–1439	Frederick III; HRE; 1415–1493	Albert VI; Archduke of Austria; 1418–1463	Sigismund; Archduke of Austria; 1427–1496
Ladislaus the Posthumous; 1440–1457	Maximilian I HRE; 1459–1519
Philip I of Castile; 1478–1506
Spanish / Iberian line	Austrian / HRE line
Charles V HRE; 1500–1558	Ferdinand I HRE; 1503–1564
Philip II of Spain; 1527–1598	Maximilian II; HRE; 1527–1576	Ferdinand II; Archduke of Austria; 1529–1595	Charles II; Archduke of Austria; 1540–1590
Carlos; Prince of Asturias; 1545–1568	Philip III of Spain; 1578–1621	Rudolf II; HRE; 1552–1612	Ernest of Austria; 1553–1595	Matthias; HRE; 1557–1619	Maximilian III; Archduke of Austria; 1558–1618	Albert VII; Archduke of Austria; 1559–1621	Wenceslaus; Archduke of Austria; 1561–1578	Andrew; Margrave of Burgau; 1558–1600	Charles; Margrave of Burgau; 1560–1618	Ferdinand II; HRE; 1578–1637	Maximilian Ernest of Austria; 1583–1616	Leopold V Archduke of Austria; 1586–1632	Charles of Austria; 1590–1624
Philip IV of Spain; 1605–1665	Charles of Austria; 1607–1632	Ferdinand of Austria; 1609–1641	John-Charles of Austria; 1605–1619	Ferdinand III; HRE; 1608–1657	Leopold Wilhelm of Austria; 1614–1662	Ferdinand Charles; Archduke of Austria; 1628–1662	Sigismund Francis; Archduke of Austria; 1630–1665
Balthasar Charles; Prince of Asturias; 1629–1646	Charles II of Spain; 1661–1700	Ferdinand IV; King of the Romans; 1633–1654	Leopold I HRE; 1640–1705	Charles Joseph of Austria; 1649–1664
Joseph I HRE; 1678–1711	Charles VI; HRE; 1685–1740
Lorraine
Maria Theresa; HRE; 1740–1780	Francis I HRE; 1745–1765
Habsburg-Lorraine
Joseph II; HRE; 1765–1790	Leopold II; HRE; 1790–1792
Francis II; HRE; 1792–1806

== Sources ==
- George, Hereford Brooke (1875). Genealogical Tables Illustrative of Modern History. Oxford at the Clarendon Press.
- Previté-Orton, Charles William (1960). The Shorter Cambridge Medieval History. Vol. 2. Cambridge University Press.

Albert I of Germany House of Habsburg Born: 1255 Died: 1308
Regnal titles
Preceded by Rudolph IV; Rudolph V	Count of Habsburg; 1291–1308 with Rudolph VI (1298–1307)	Succeeded by Leopold I
Preceded by Adolf	King of Germany; 1298–1308	Succeeded by Henry VII
Preceded by Adolf	Margrave of Meissen; 1298–1307 with Theodoric II (1291–1307); Frederick I (1291–1323)	Succeeded by Frederick II
Preceded by Rudolph I	Duke of Austria and Styria; 1282–1308 with Rudolph II (1282–83); Rudolph III (1298–1307)	Succeeded by Frederick the Fair; Leopold I
