= Elizabeth of Bavaria, Duchess of Austria =

Elizabeth of Bavaria
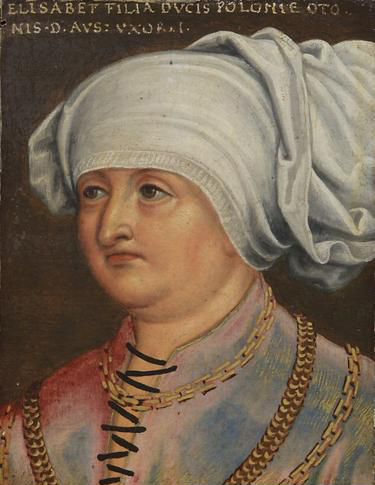
- 16th century portrait of Elizabeth of Bavaria by Anton Boys.

Duchess consort of Austria
- Tenure: January 1330 – 25 March 1330
- Born: c. 1306
- Died: 25 March 1330; Vienna, Austria
- Burial: Neuberg Abbey
- Spouse: Otto, Duke of Austria
- Issue: Frederick II; Leopold II, Duke of Austria
- House: Wittelsbach
- Father: Stephen I, Duke of Bavaria
- Mother: Jutta of Schweidnitz

Elizabeth of Bavaria (c. 1306 – 25 March 1330) was the first wife of Otto, Duke of Austria. She was the daughter of Stephen I, Duke of Bavaria and Jutta of Schweidnitz.

Otto and Elizabeth married on 15 May 1325 and had two children:

- Frederick II (10 February 1327 – 11 December 1344)
- Leopold II (1328 – 10 August 1344)

Otto acceded to the title of Duke of Austria at the death of Frederick the Fair in January 1330, but Elizabeth died two months later.
