= Neuberg Abbey =

Cistercian monastery in Neuberg an der Mürz, Austria

Coordinates: 47°39′47″N 15°34′43″E

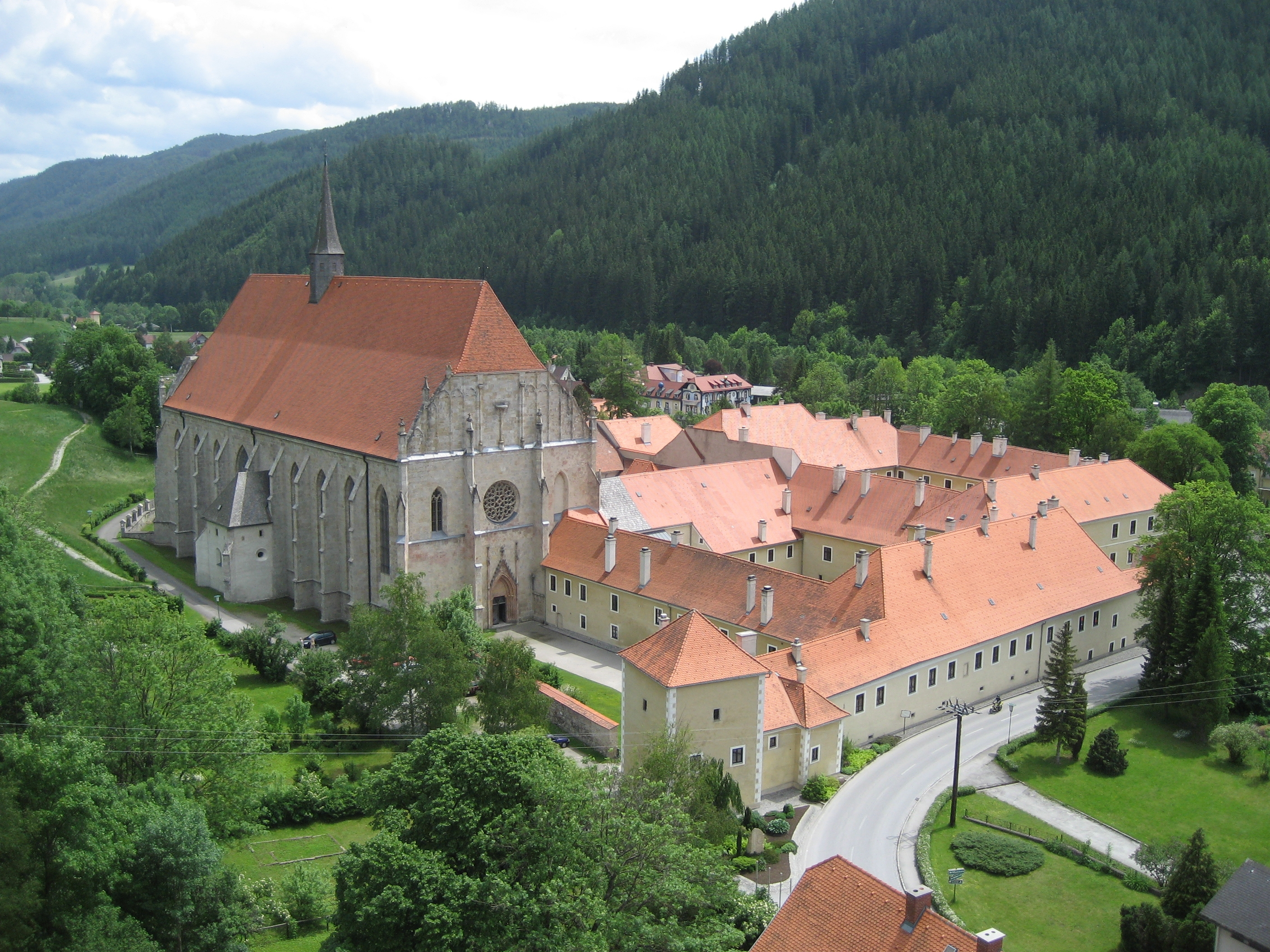
Stift Neuberg

Neuberg Abbey (German: Stift Neuberg) is a former Cistercian monastery in Neuberg an der Mürz in Styria, Austria, and is one of the few extant set of monastic buildings in Austria to have retained its medieval character to any great extent.

== History ==
The abbey was founded in 1327 as a filial monastery of Stift Heiligenkreuz by the Habsburg Duke Otto the Merry, who died here in 1339. Its foundation was to celebrate the birth of Otto's son, Frederick. Upon its founding, it had twelve monks, including the Abbot, Friedrich. The abbey was a center of settlement in the Mürz valley, and its deanery was charged with the pastoral care for Neuberg an der Mürz, Mürzzuschlag, Langenwang, and Krieglach. Construction proceeded rapidly, but due to a mid-14th century plague epidemic, the abbey church would not be finished until the reign of Frederick III. The Treaty of Neuberg was signed there in 1397.

Neuberg Abbey was suppressed in 1786 by Emperor Joseph II. The abbey church became a parish church for Neuberg, with the rest of the property becoming property of the Styrian state religious fund. In 1850, the partly ruined premises were converted for use as a hunting lodge for Emperor Franz Joseph I following the 1848 revocation of exclusive Habsburg hunting rights over the Vienna Woods. In 1918, the buildings became property of the Austrian state, owned by the Austrian Federal Forestry until 2006. Currently, the abbey buildings are the site of two museums and 50 hotel rooms, also housing several offices.

== Architecture ==
The interior of the abbey church

The abbey's layout is inspired by that of Heiligenkreuz Abbey, its mother house. The cloisters and the chapter house contain precious reliefs, which are among the most important specimens of 14th-century sculpture in Austria.

=== Abbey Church ===
Construction on the monumental sandstone High Gothic hall church began about 1330 and was not completed until the reign of Frederick III, in 1496. The roof-timbers from the first half of the 15th century contain more than 1100 m³ of larch wood and constitute the largest and most important construction of this sort in the German-speaking world. The nine-bayed church interior is dominated by the Baroque high altar, dating from 1612. It contains ten further altars, nine of which are baroque and one gothic.

The abbey church is now Neuberg's parish church, dedicated to the Assumption of Mary.
