= Agnes of Austria (1281–1364) =

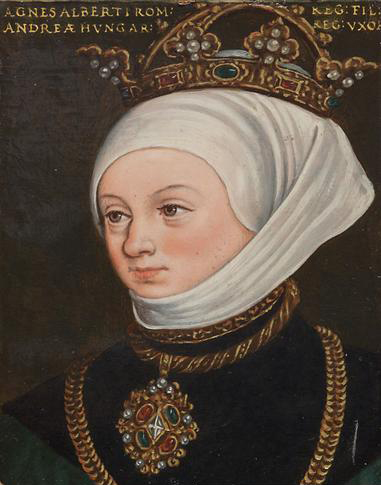
- Agnes by Anton Boys

Queen consort of Hungary
- Tenure: 1296–1301
- Born: 18 May 1281
- Died: 10 June 1364 (aged 83); Königsfelden, County of Tyrol, Holy Roman Empire
- Burial: Königsfelden Monastery, County of Tyrol, Holy Roman Empire
- Spouse: Andrew III of Hungary
- House: Habsburg (by birth); Árpád (by marriage)
- Father: Albert I of Germany
- Mother: Elisabeth of Tirol

Agnes of Austria (18 May 1281 – 10 June 1364) was Queen of Hungary by marriage to Andrew III of Hungary.

== Life ==
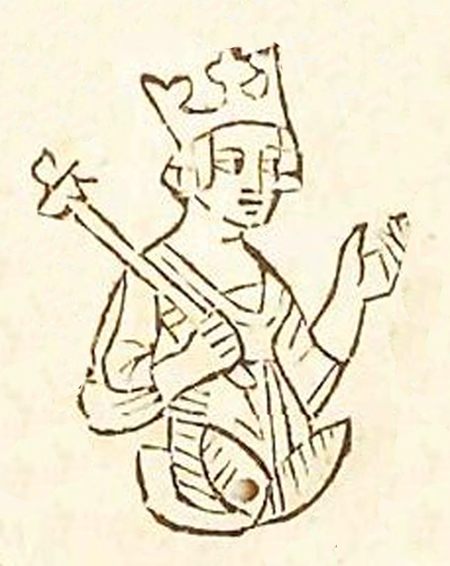
Agnes of Austria, Queen of Hungary

Agnes was a daughter of Albert I, King of Germany and his wife, Elisabeth of Tirol. By birth, she was member of the House of Habsburg and by marriage the Queen of Hungary.

=== Queen ===
On 13 February 1296 in Vienna, Agnes married Andrew III of Hungary. Afterwards, with his father-in-law's support, Andrew managed to defeat the revolt of Miklós Kőszegi and Máté Csák III, and occupy the castles of Kőszeg and Pozsony. In 1298 Andrew supported with troops his father-in-law's revolt against King Adolf of Germany.

Agnes disliked tournaments, but liked sermons. Since she was small of stature, she used to wear dresses her sisters no longer wanted, which gained her praise for modesty.

The death of Andrew III on 14 January 1301, at Buda, ended the male line of the Árpáds. Stephen Ákos, one of his contemporaries called him "the last golden twig of the Árpáds".

=== Later life ===
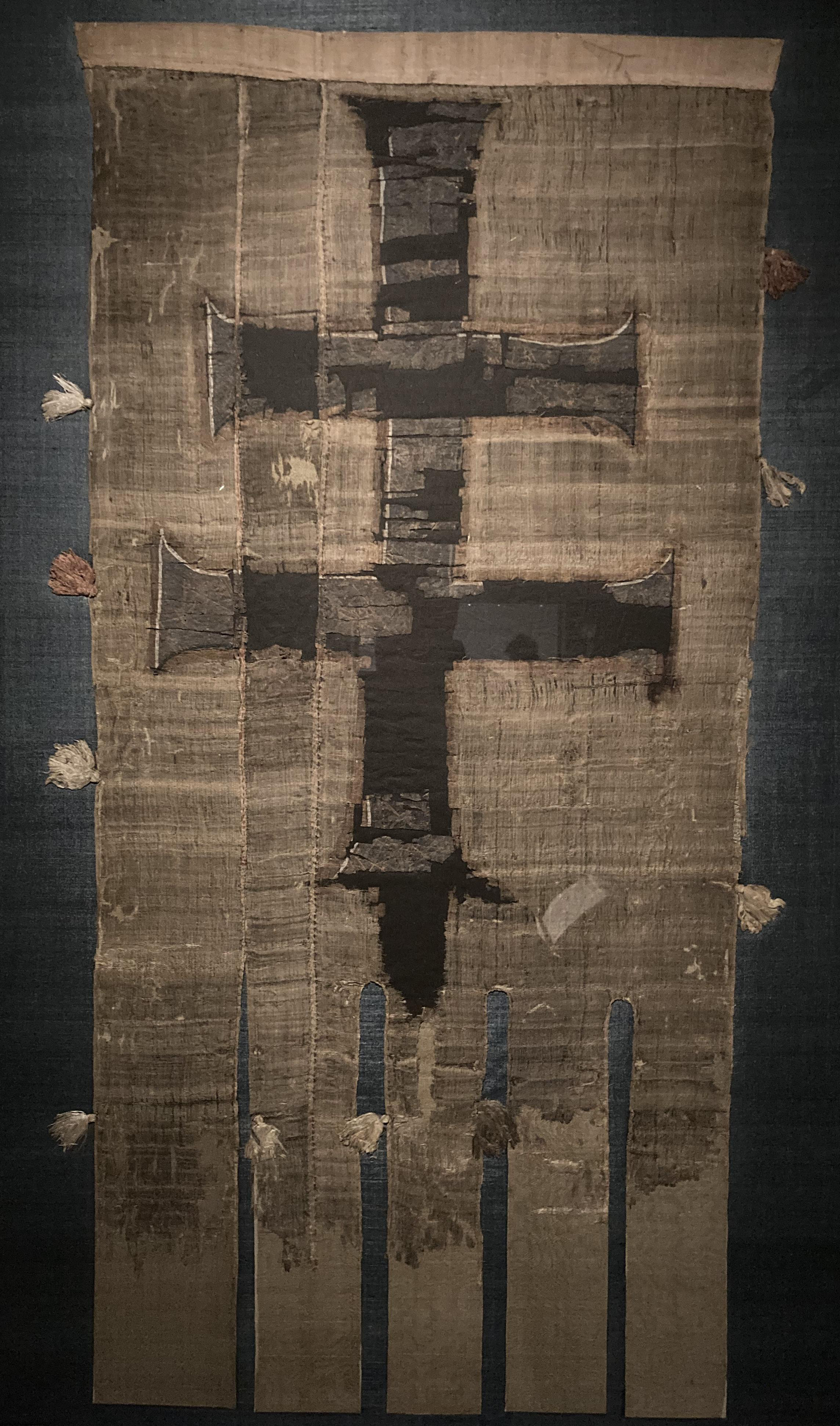
Hungarian flag from Königsfelden Monastery from the first half of the 14th century, from the monastery of Agnes of Habsburg, widow of King Andrew III of Hungary (1290–1301)

At that point, Agnes was a widow and she had no children to carry on the Árpád dynasty. However she was only 19 so was still able to remarry and have children but she never did. Agnes became a patroness of Königsfelden Monastery in the County of Tyrol, which had been founded by her mother in memory of her late husband. Agnes took her stepdaughter Elizabeth with her and went to live there in a small house near the monastery. She was one of the final members of the Arpad family. Elizabeth was expected to marry Wenceslaus III of Bohemia, but the wedding never happened since Wenceslaus instead married Viola Elisabeth of Cieszyn. Left free, she became a Dominican nun at the nearby Töss Monastery, where she gained a reputation for holiness.

Agnes was depicted as pious. On the other hand, according to the 16th century Chronicon helveticum of Aegidius Tschudi, she avenged her father's murder by ordering the execution and expulsion of 1000 people (families and followers of his murderers), but it appears this report was to a large extent based on Swiss anti-Habsburg propaganda. Because of her good reputation, she was asked several times to act as mediator. In 1333, she established a treaty between Austria and a number of Swiss towns and regions during the Gümmenenkrieg. In 1351, she solved a dispute between Basel and Bremen and did the same in the same year for Albert II, Duke of Austria and the Swiss Confederacy. Her brothers often came to see her in Königsfelden to ask for advice.

The Book of Divine Consolation written by Meister Eckhart was likely partially intended as a gift for Agnes. In the book the author aims to console the reader and gives around 30 reasons why a person should not be saddened by any unfortune.

Agnes died on 10 June 1364 at Königsfelden, and was buried in the nuns' cemetery of Königsfelden Monastery.

== Ancestry ==
Ancestors of Agnes of Austria (1281–1364)

8. Albert IV, Count of Habsburg
4. Rudolf I of Germany
9. Heilwig of Kiburg
2. Albert I of Germany
10. Burckhard V, Count of Hohenburg
5. Gertrude of Hohenberg
11. Mechtild of Tübingen
1. Agnes of Austria
12. Meinhard I of Gorizia-Tyrol
6. Meinhard, Duke of Carinthia
13. Adelaide of Tyrol
3. Elisabeth of Tirol
14. Otto II Wittelsbach, Duke of Bavaria
7. Elisabeth of Bavaria
15. Agnes of the Palatinate

Agnes of Austria (1281–1364) House of Habsburg Born: 1281 Died: 1364
Royal titles
Preceded by Fenenna of Kuyavia	Queen consort of Hungary; 1296–1301	Succeeded by Viola Elisabeth of Cieszyn
