= Anna of Tyrol =

Holy Roman Empress from 1612 to 1618

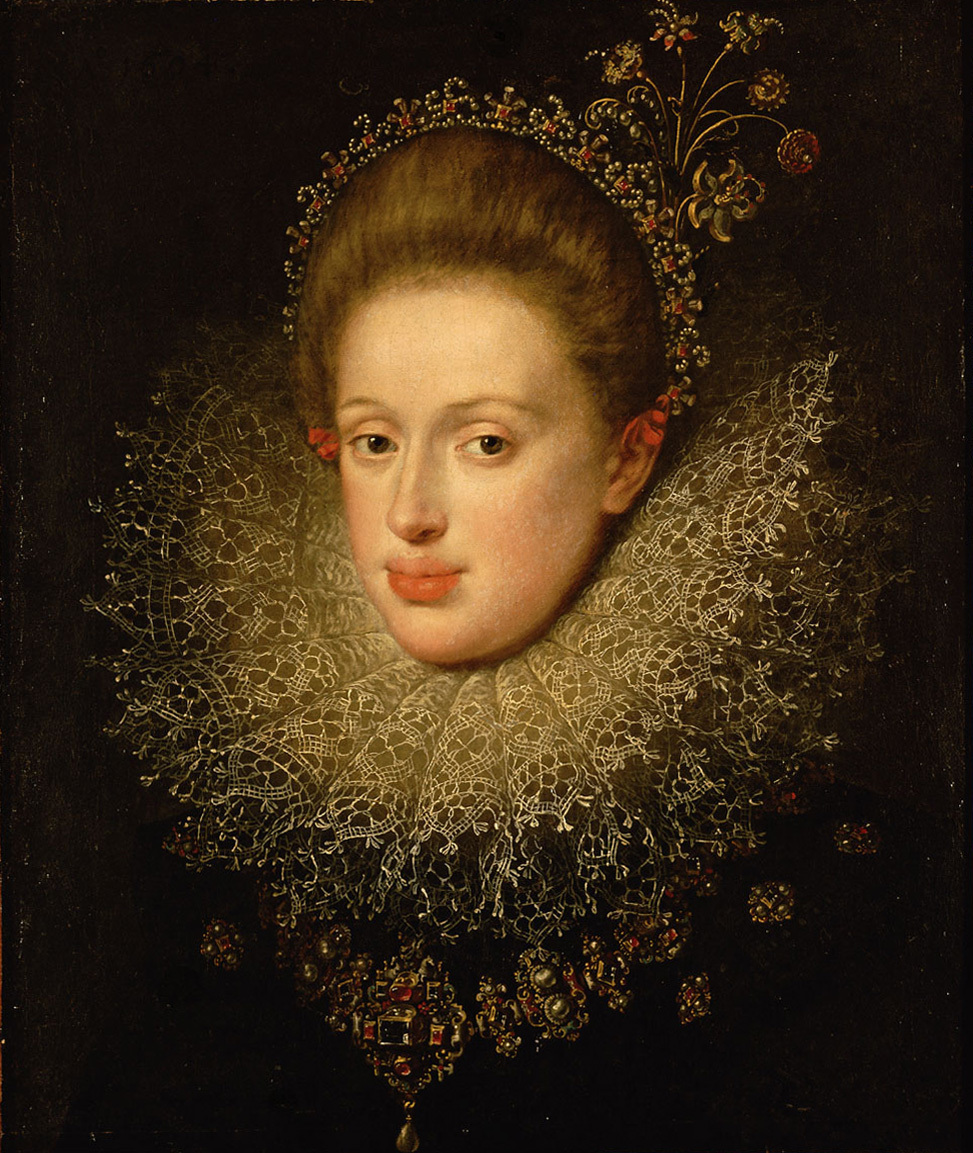
- Portrait by Hans von Aachen, c. 1604

Holy Roman Empress German Queen
- Tenure: 21 May 1612 – 14 December 1618
- Coronation: 15 June 1612

Queen consort of Hungary and Bohemia Archduchess consort of Austria
- Tenure: 4 December 1611 – 14 December 1618
- Coronation: 23 March 1613 (Hungary); 10 January 1616 (Bohemia)
- Born: 4 October 1585; Innsbruck, County of Tyrol, Holy Roman Empire
- Died: 14 December 1618 (aged 33); Vienna, Archduchy of Austria, Holy Roman Empire
- Burial: Imperial Crypt, Vienna
- Spouse: Matthias, Holy Roman Emperor (m. 1611)
- House: Habsburg
- Father: Ferdinand II, Archduke of Austria
- Mother: Anna Juliana Gonzaga

Anna of Tyrol (4 October 1585 – 14 December 1618) was by birth an Archduchess of Austria and member of the Tyrolean branch of the House of Habsburg. By marriage, she was Holy Roman Empress, German Queen, Queen of Bohemia and Queen of Hungary.

The first crowned Holy Roman Empress since the mid-15th century, she was responsible for the moving of the Imperial court from Prague to Vienna, which became one of the centers of European culture. A proponent of the Counter-Reformation, she held a great influence over her husband Matthias, with whom she founded the Imperial Crypt, which later became the burial place of the Habsburg dynasty.

== Biography ==
=== Early years ===
Anna was born in Innsbruck on 4 October 1585 as the third and last daughter of Ferdinand II, Archduke of Further Austria, and Count of Tyrol, and his second wife, Anna Caterina Gonzaga. She had two older sisters, Archduchesses Anna Eleonore (26 June 1583 – 15 January 1584) and Maria (16 June 1584 – 2 March 1649), later a nun. All of them suffered from poor health from birth.

Her baptism was conducted with special solemnity, being organized by her cousin Maximilian III, Archduke of Austria, and uncle Prince Ferdinand of Bavaria.

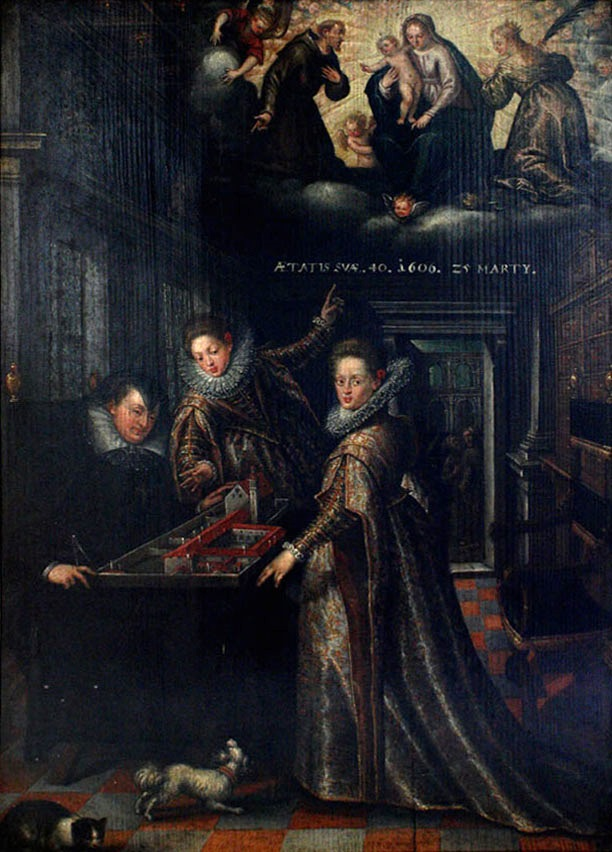
Dowager Archduchess Anna Catherina with her daughters Anna and Maria.

Anna spent her childhood at the Innsbruck court, which thanks to her parents became in the center of Renaissance culture. She lived in Ambras Castle, Hofburg and Ruelyust Palaces. In order to protect the health of her daughter, after 1590 Archduchess-Countess Anna Caterina had a personal cookbook. In January 1595, the princess lost her father. Her widowed mother made every effort to give her daughters a good education. Anna then discovered an unusual musical talent, she was given a clavichord (a rare and expensive instrument), and a teacher was hired. The love for music remained in the princess throughout her life.

Anna was raised in a strict Catholic environment. Even as Holy Roman Empress, when she believed that she had committed a sin, she engaged in self-flagellation to torment the flesh. Anna Caterina made frequent pilgrimages, but didn't take her daughters with her due to their poor health. In 1606, she decided to found a convent there in Innsbruck for the Servants of Mary, Religious Sisters of the Servite Third Order, of which she was a member, and after arranging the marriage of her youngest daughter, she took her monastic vows, taking a new name – Anna Juliana. Maria, Anna's older sister, followed their mother's example and also took the veil in the same convent under their mother's former name.

=== Marriage and coronation ===
Upon reaching adulthood, Anna began to receive offers of marriage. The first proposal was made in 1603 by King Sigismund III of Poland (then a widower), but Emperor Rudolf II did not give his consent. Then the emperor expressed his intention to marry the princess and sent his court painter to Innsbruck, to make a portrait of his intended bride. Once the emperor showed his interest in Anna, her mother stopped taking other marriage proposals for her, but soon Rudolf II retracted his proposal. The emperor's younger brother Archduke Matthias also began to woo her, and some time later, Rudolf II allowed the marriage of his brother to his former fiancée.

Anna and Matthias (at that point already King of Hungary and Bohemia) married on 4 December 1611 in Vienna at the Augustinian Church; bride and groom were first cousins –Matthias' father Emperor Maximilian II was an elder brother of Anna's father, Archduke Ferdinand II. Matthias, although he was already in his fifties, hoped to sire an heir with his 26-year-old wife. Four years later, when Anna became slightly stout, rumors began at the imperial court that she had finally become pregnant. But soon courtiers began to joke that her corpulence was not related to a pregnancy but because she had a very good appetite. Ultimately, the union was childless.

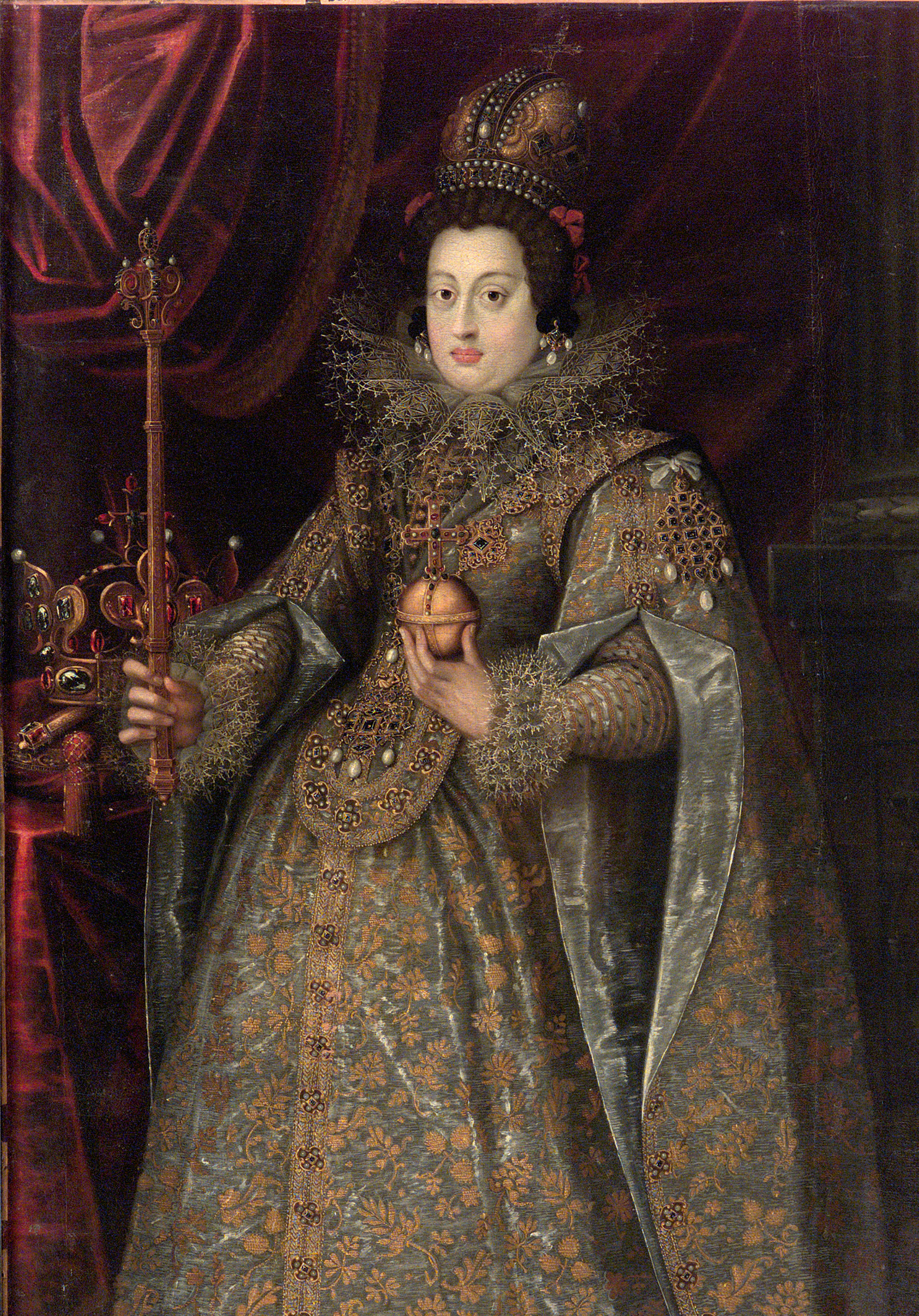
Anna as Holy Roman Empress.

On 21 May 1612 Matthias was elected King of Germany and Holy Roman Emperor. Anna was crowned Holy Roman Empress and Queen of Germany in Frankfurt on 15 June 1612, two days after her husband, re-assuming the tradition of the coronation of emperors' wives. She was the first crowned empress since Eleanor of Portugal. Anna was also crowned Queen of Hungary on 25 March 1613 in Pressburg and Queen of Bohemia on 10 January 1616 in Prague.

Called the "Good-natured and loving Empress", she had a great influence over her husband, jointly with Matthias' mistress Susana Wachter. Contemporaries called both spouses the "Working Couple" (de: Arbeitspaar). Upon his wife's request Matthias transferred the Imperial court from Prague to Vienna, and soon, thanks to their joint efforts, the new court was one of the centers of European culture. The empress was also noted for the special protection she provided to her Tyrolean subjects, arranging different positions for them at court. As a devout Catholic, she refused to talk to or interact with Protestant courtiers. Like her mother, Anna collected relics, especially from the holy ascetics. She also patronized the Capuchins, and later played an important role in the Austrian Counter-Reformation. For her devotion to the Roman Catholic Church, Pope Paul V awarded the Empress with the Golden Rose.

=== Last years and death ===
In 1617 Anna and her husband founded the Capuchin Church, Vienna. On 10 November 1618 construction began on their tomb. Anna died a month after construction started, on 14 December 1618 aged 33; her husband died only three months later, on 20 March 1619. Both spouses were temporarily buried in the royal Poor Clare monastery in Vienna. (Note: The monastery, which were first buried the remains of Anna and Matthias, was demolished in 1782. Later on this place, new buildings were built, most of which were Protestant prayer houses.) Only after the completion of construction of the built, which was continued by their cousin and successor, Emperor Ferdinand II, in 1633 the coffins with the remains of Matthias and Anna were transferred into the tomb, known as the Imperial Crypt. Their coffins were placed side by side. It was only during the reign of Ferdinand III that the Imperial crypt finally became the burial place of the Habsburg dynasty.

== Ancestors ==
Ancestors of Anna of Tyrol

8. Philip I of Castile (=28)
4. Ferdinand I, Holy Roman Emperor
9. Joanna of Castile (=29)
2. Ferdinand II, Archduke of Austria
10. Vladislas II of Bohemia and Hungary (=30)
5. Anna of Bohemia and Hungary (=15)
11. Anna of Foix-Candale (=31)
1. Archduchess Maria of Austria
12. Federico II Gonzaga, Duke of Mantua
6. Guglielmo Gonzaga, Duke of Mantua
13. Margaret Paleologa
3. Anna Juliana Gonzaga
14. Ferdinand I, Holy Roman Emperor
7. Archduchess Eleanor of Austria
15. Anna of Bohemia and Hungary (=5)

== Bibliography ==
- Braun, Bettina; Keller, Katrin; Schnettger, Matthias (4 April 2016). Nur die Frau des Kaisers?: Kaiserinnen in der Frühen Neuzeit (in German). Böhlau Verlag Wien. p. 99–116. ISBN 978-3-205-20085-7.
- Korotin, Ilse (2016). Lexikon österreichischer Frauen. Vienna: Böhlau. ISBN 978-3-20-579590-2., pp. 152–4248 p. online
- Wurzbach, C. von (2012) [1860]. "Eleonore Gonzaga". Biographisches Lexikon des Kaisertums Österreich (in German). Austria: Austrian Literature Online, University of Innsbruck. p. 152, 492 p.

Anna of Tyrol House of Habsburg Born: 4 October 1585 Died: 14 December 1618
German royalty
Vacant Title last held by Maria of Spain	Empress of the Holy Roman Empire; German Queen; 1612–1618	Vacant Title next held by Eleanor of Mantua
Vacant Title last held by Maria of Spain	Queen consort of Hungary; 1611–1618	Vacant Title next held by Eleanor of Mantua
Vacant Title last held by Maria of Spain	Queen consort of Bohemia; 1611–1618	Vacant Title next held by Elizabeth of England
