= Anna Juliana Gonzaga =

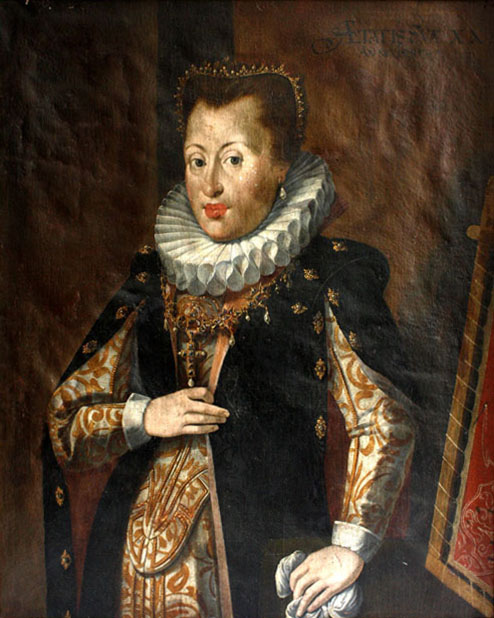
- Archduchess Anna Caterina in 1587

Archduchess consort of Further Austria
- Tenure: 14 May 1582 – 24 January 1595
- Born: 17 January 1566; Mantua, Duchy of Mantua
- Died: 3 August 1621 (aged 54)
- Spouse: Ferdinand II, Archduke of Austria (m. 1582; died 1595)
- Issue: Archduchess Eleanor of Austria; Archduchess Maria of Austria; Anna, Holy Roman Empress
- House: Gonzaga
- Father: Guglielmo Gonzaga, Duke of Mantua
- Mother: Archduchess Eleanor of Austria
- Religion: Roman Catholic

Anna Caterina Gonzaga (religious name Anna Juliana; 17 January 1566 – 3 August 1621) became Archduchess consort of Further Austria through her marriage. She became a religious sister of the Servite Order following the death of her husband, Ferdinand II, Archduke of Austria.

== Early life ==
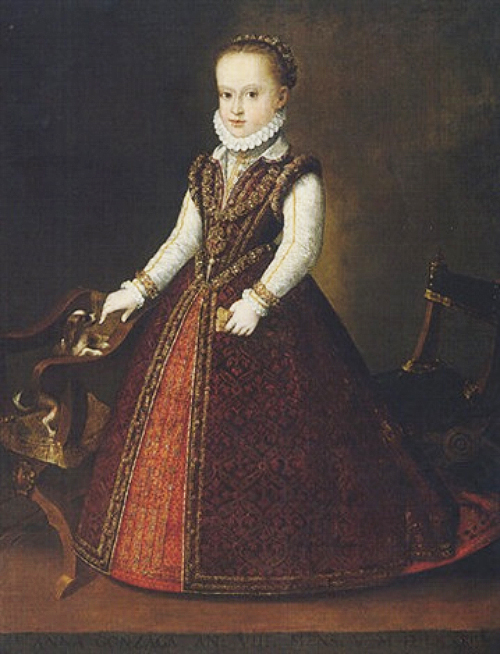
Portrait of Anna Caterina Gonzaga as a child in Mantua

Anna Caterina Gonzaga was born on 17 January 1566 in Mantua. She was the daughter of Guglielmo Gonzaga, Duke of Mantua and Archduchess Eleanor of Austria. Her godfather was King Philip II of Spain.

Contemporary accounts note that she was raised in a devout Catholic household under her mother's guidance, with a strong emphasis on Marian devotion.

== Marriage ==
On 14 May 1582, at age 15, Anna Caterina Gonzaga married her maternal uncle, Ferdinand II, Archduke of Austria, in Innsbruck. It followed the death of Ferdinand's first wife, Philippine Welser, and was arranged with the consent of Anna Caterina's father, Guglielmo Gonzaga, Duke of Mantua. The union was probably facilitated by Ferdinand's sister (also Anna's aunt) Archduchess Magdalena. The couple made many pilgrimages together.

The marriage produced three daughters: Eleanor (1583–1584), Maria (1584–1649), and Anna (1585–1618). Eleanor died in infancy; Maria became Abbess of Seckau, and remained by her mother's side; and Anna married Emperor Matthias of the Holy Roman Empire in 1611.

Ferdinand II died in 1595, leaving no male heirs; his territories passed to his brother, Archduke Ferdinand III.

== Widowhood ==
After Ferdinand's death in 1595, Anna managed the Innsbruck palace and cared for her two daughters. She is described in contemporary sources as adopting a more austere lifestyle, wearing simple clothing and focusing on religious devotion. As such, she wore a black veil with a rosary around her neck.

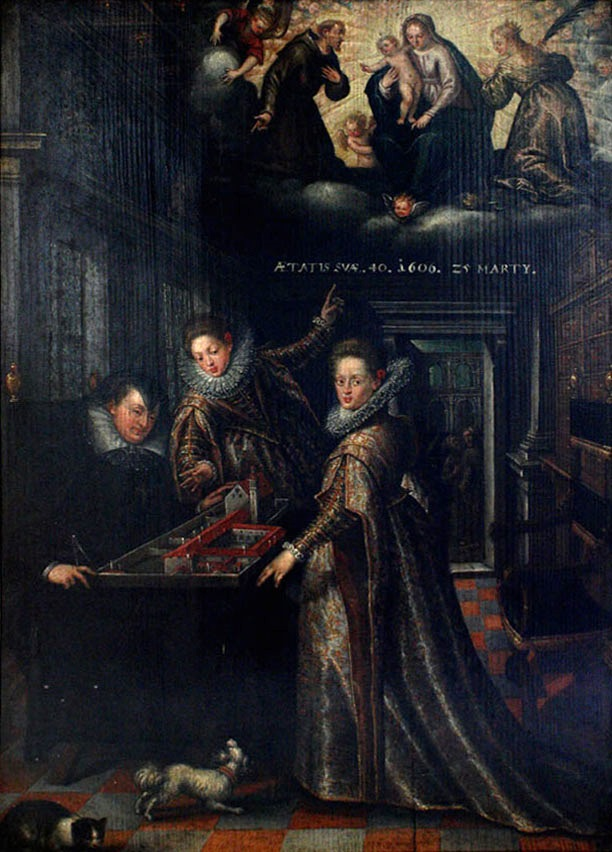
Anna Caterina as a widow depicted with her two daughters, Maria and Anna, c. 1606

In her palace, Anna lived in small quarters, connected via a secret hallway to a large adjacent chapel that she had built after Ferdinand's death. Her room was simple, containing a bed made of hard wood, covered by a thin sheet. She abdicated primary care of her two daughters to the Baroness of Brandes.

At the palace, everyone's day was expected to revolve around religious piety and devotion. Anna was, in her own way, now carrying out a semi-monastic lifestyle; of which she had long desired. She would fast every Friday, her health permitting.

A large sum of Anna Caterina’s money was given to the Catholic Church to finance philanthropic institutions for the poor of Innsbruck and Mantua. She used to invite and feed the poor at her palace.

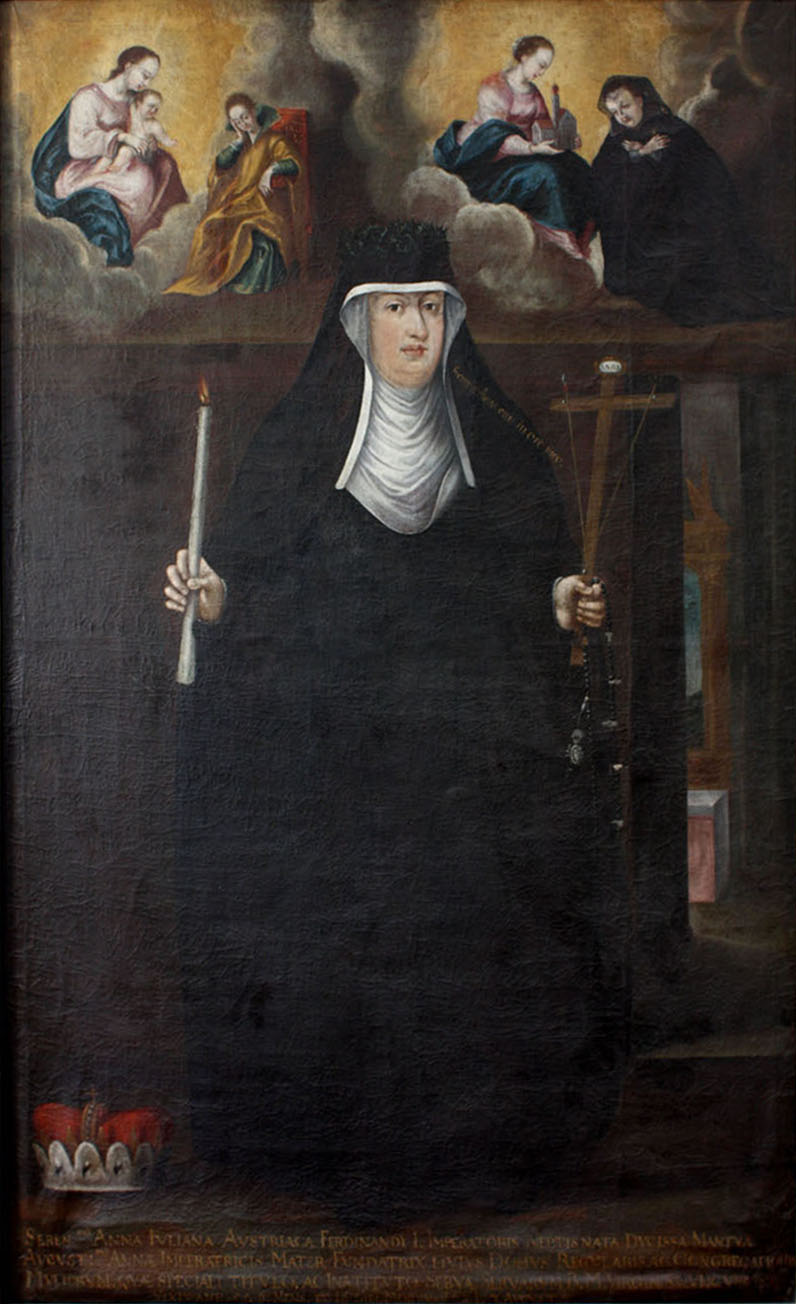
Anna Juliana as a Servite sister

== Religious life and veneration ==
Devotional narratives have been associated with Anna Caterina Gonzaga's decision to pursue religious life, but historical sources document her role in establishing Servite houses in Innsbruck in the early seventeenth century. In 1606, she founded a women's double convent for the Servite Order in Innsbruck, consisting of an enclosed convent for cloistered sisters and a Regelhaus for women living in common life without solemn vows. She entered the Servite way of life under the name Anna Juliana on 2 February 1612, and later supported the establishment of a Servite men's monastery and church in 1614. Repository and local histories note that the Servite community in Innsbruck was established between 1613 and 1616 and developed significantly in the seventeenth century.

Upon the completion of the convent, Anna entered the community and took the Servite religious habit, along with the name Anna Juliana, in honour of the founder of the order. It was there that she died in 1621. She was buried in the same crypt in which her daughter Maria was later buried in. In 1783, both of their remains were transferred following the secularization of the convent to a Jesuit church. Anna and Maria found their final resting places in Servitenkirchen on Maria-Theresien-Straße in Innsbruck in 1693.

Following her death, devotion to Anna as a saint began to develop. In 1693, a process for her canonization was opened by the Bishop of Brixen/Bressanone of the time, Count Johann Franz von Khuen zu Liechtenberg. but has not advanced since.

== Ancestry ==
Ancestors of Anna Juliana Gonzaga

Francesco II Gonzaga, Marquess of Mantua
Federico II Gonzaga, Duke of Mantua
Isabella d'Este
Guglielmo Gonzaga, Duke of Mantua
William IX, Marquess of Montferrat
Margaret Paleologa
Anne d'Alençon
Anne Juliana Gonzaga
Philip I of Castile
Ferdinand I, Holy Roman Emperor
Joanna of Castile
Archduchess Eleanor of Austria
Vladislaus II of Bohemia and Hungary
Anna of Bohemia and Hungary
Anna of Foix-Candale

== External sources ==
- Dourche, Joachim M. / Schenk, Jessie (translator) A Servant of Mary: Anne Juliana of Gonzaga, Archduchess of Austria, Third Order Servite (1566–1621). Sisters, Servants of Mary, Ladysmith, Wisconsin 1995. ISBN N/A.
