= Ferdinand II of Austria =

Archduke of Further Austria from 1564 to 1595

Ferdinand II
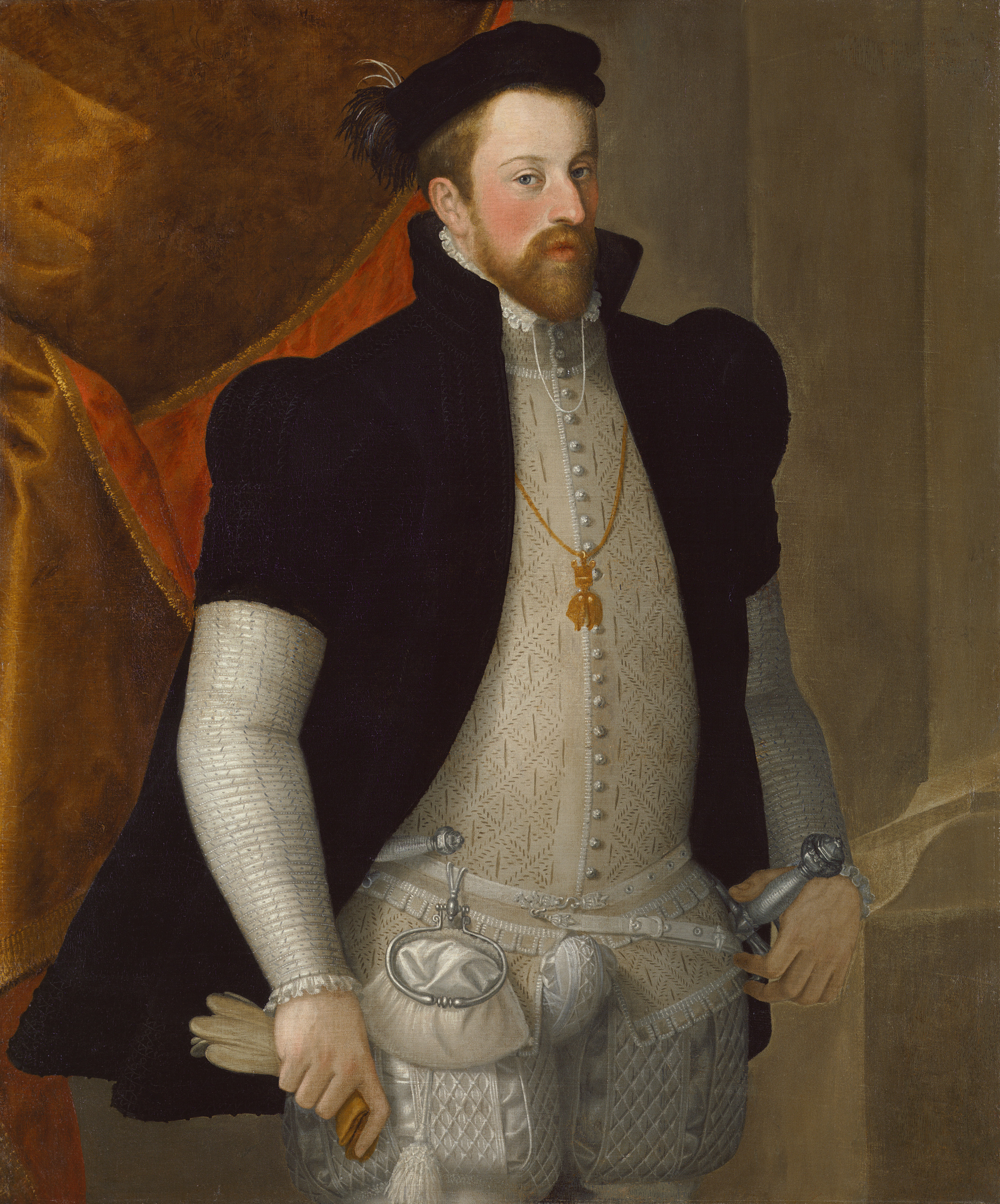
- Portrait by Francesco Terzi

Archduke of Further Austria
- Reign: 25 July 1564 – 24 January 1595
- Predecessor: Ferdinand I
- Successor: Matthias
- Born: 14 June 1529; Linz, Archduchy of Austria, Holy Roman Empire
- Died: 24 January 1595 (aged 65); Innsbruck, County of Tyrol, Holy Roman Empire
- Spouse: Philippine Welser (m. 1557; died 1580) Anna Caterina Gonzaga (m. 1582)
- Issue more...: Andrew, Margrave of Burgau; Charles, Margrave of Burgau; Archduchess Eleanor of Austria; Archduchess Maria of Austria; Anna, Holy Roman Empress
- House: Habsburg
- Father: Ferdinand I, Holy Roman Emperor
- Mother: Anna of Bohemia and Hungary

Ferdinand II, Archduke of Austria (14 June 1529 – 24 January 1595) was the ruler of Further Austria and the Imperial Count of Tyrol from 1564 until his death. The son of Ferdinand I, Holy Roman Emperor, he was secretly married to Philippine Welser, with whom he had several surviving children. After Welser's death he married Anna Caterina Gonzaga. Through his second marriage he was the father of Anna of Tyrol, the future Holy Roman Empress.

== Biography ==
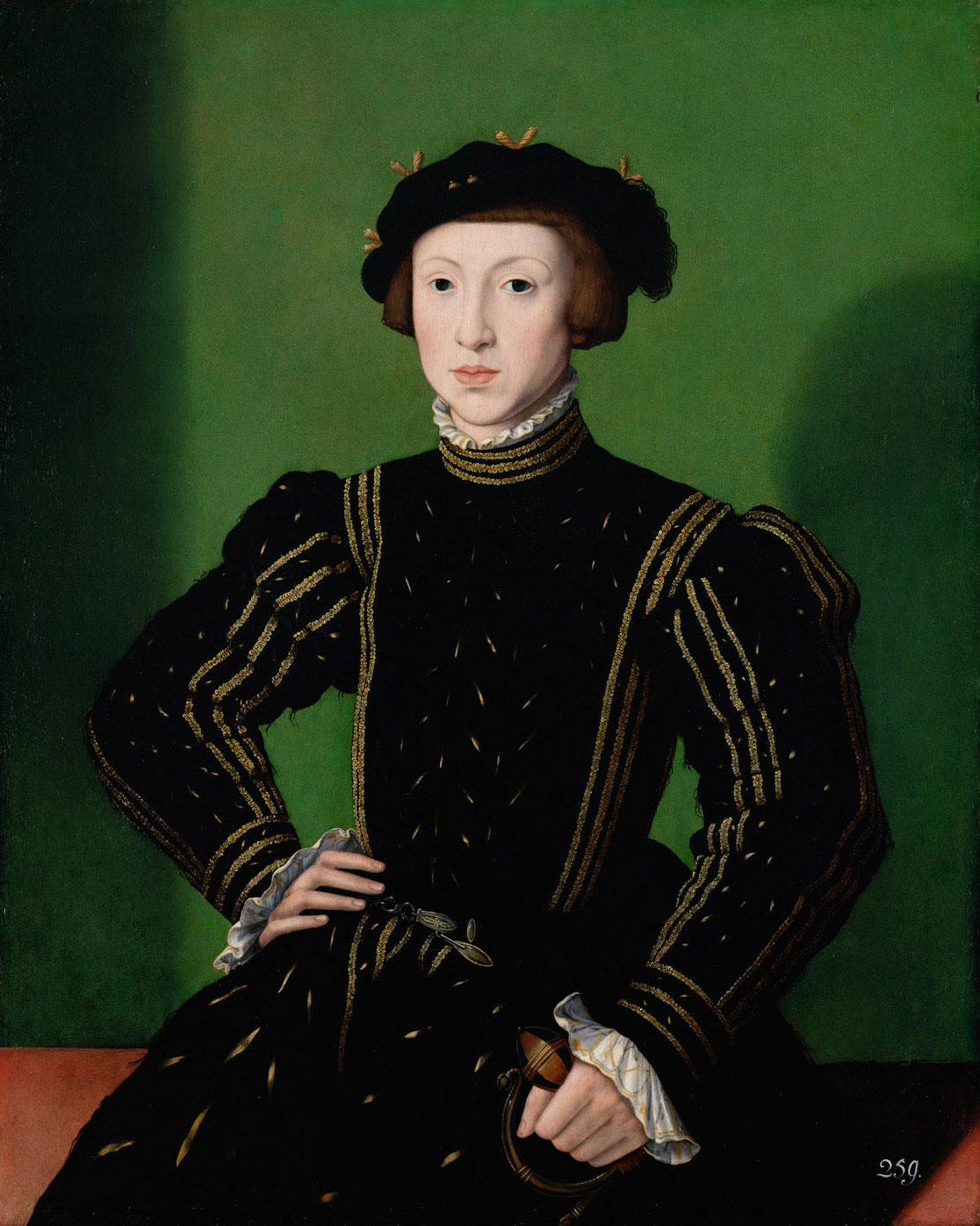
Archduke Ferdinand at a young age

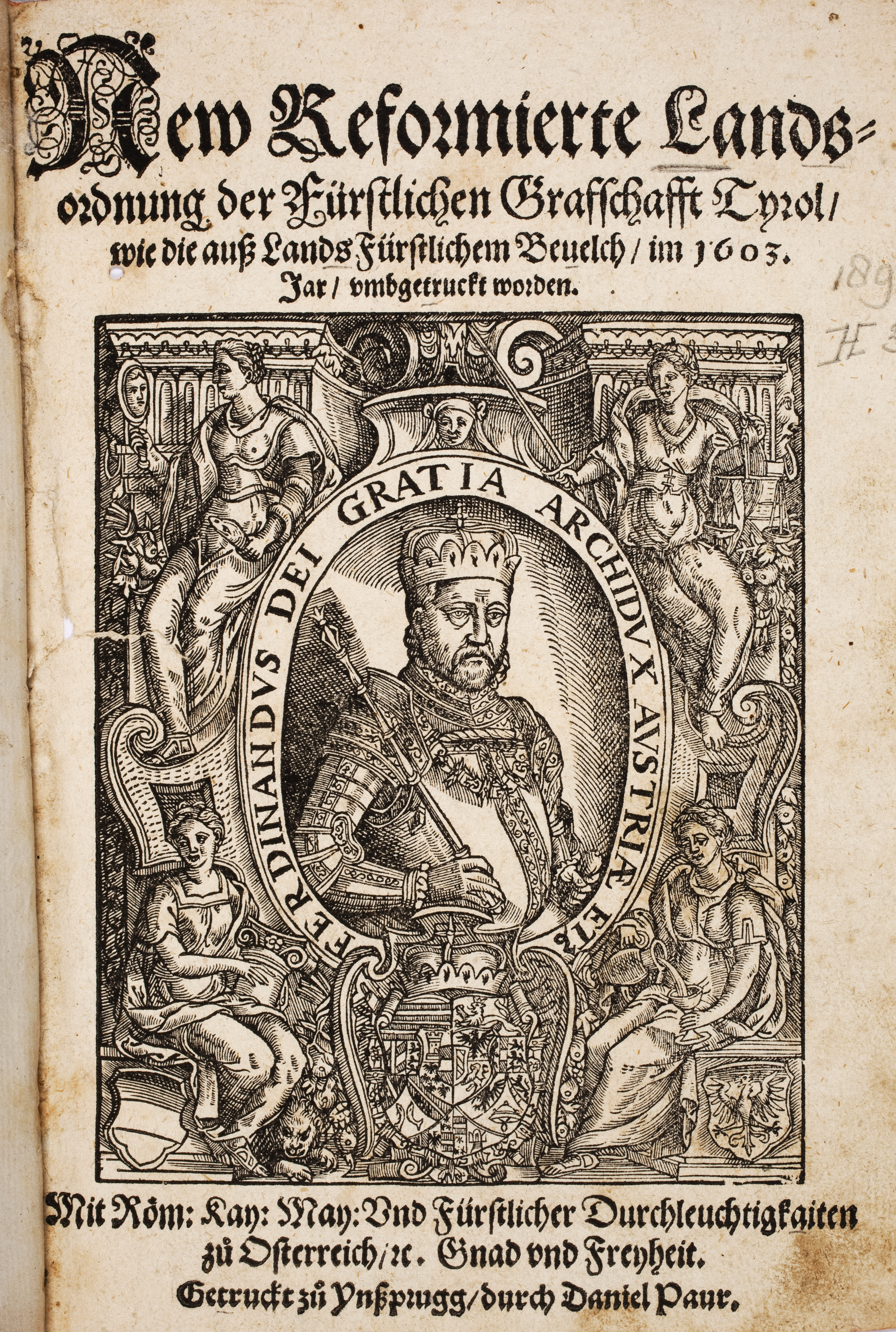
Engraving of Ferdinand, published in New Reformierte Landts-Ordnung Der Fürstlichen Graffschafft Tyrol Wie Die Auss Lands-Fürstlichem Befelch, Im 1603

Archduke Ferdinand of Austria was the second son of Ferdinand I, Holy Roman Emperor and Anna of Bohemia and Hungary. He was a younger brother of Emperor Maximilian II.

He grew up in Innsbruck, where his father governed the Austrian hereditary lands on behalf of Ferdinand's uncle Charles V.

Ferdinand was said to be the favorite son of his father. He was described by a visiting dignitary to court as "handsome and friendlier" than his brother Maximilian.

Ferdinand and his siblings were raised very strictly and given a thorough education. Among his teachers were Kaspar Ursinus Velius and Georg Tannstätter. Ferdinand and his brother were educated in languages, and other young noble boys were invited to court to be educated alongside the two archdukes. They were not to speak to them in German, only in Latin, Czech or other foreign languages.

Ferdinand was also instructed in the Catholic religion and their God-given right to rule, and that this was a gift based on the condition that they were to fear and love God.

At the behest of his father, he was put in charge of the administration of Bohemia in 1547. He also led the campaign against the Turks in Hungary in 1556.

In 1557, he was secretly married to Philippine Welser, daughter of a patrician from Augsburg, with whom he had several children. The marriage was only accepted by Emperor Ferdinand I in 1559 under the condition of secrecy. The children were to receive the name "of Austria" but would only be entitled to inherit if the House of Habsburg became totally extinct in the male line, and thus the marriage had many qualities of a morganatic marriage. The sons born of this marriage received the title Margrave of Burgau, an ancient Habsburg possession in Further Austria. The younger of the sons, who survived their father, later received the princely title of Fürst zu Burgau.

After his father's death in 1564, Ferdinand became the ruler of Tyrol and other Further Austrian possessions under his father's will. However, he remained governor of Bohemia in Prague until 1567, according to the wishes of his brother Maximilian II.

Coat of arms of Ferdinand II as Archduke of Further Austria and Imperial Count of Tyrol

In his own lands, Ferdinand made sure that the Catholic Counter-Reformation would prevail. He also was instrumental in promoting the Renaissance in central Europe and was an avid collector of art. He accommodated his world-famous collections in a museum built specifically for that purpose within his personal residence, Ambras Castle, making the castle one of the oldest museum in the world. As the only Renaissance Kunstkammer of its kind to have been preserved at its original location, the Chamber of Art and Curiosities at Ambras Castle is a site of cultural interest. The collection was started during Ferdinand's time in Bohemia, and he subsequently moved it to Tyrol. In particular, the Chamber of Art and Curiosities, the gallery of portraits, and the collection of armor were very expensive, leading Ferdinand to incur a high level of debt. Part of the collections remained in Innsbruck, and other parts ultimately moved to the Kunsthistorisches Museum in Vienna.

After the death of his wife Philippine in 1580, he married his niece, Anna Caterina Gonzaga, a daughter of William I, Duke of Mantua, in 1582.

Archduke Ferdinand died on 24 January 1595. Since his sons from the first marriage were not entitled to the inheritance, and the second produced only surviving daughters, Tyrol was reunified with the other Habsburg lands. His daughter from the Mantuan marriage to Anna Caterina (later Anna Juliana) became Empress Anna, consort of Mathias, Holy Roman Emperor, who received his Further Austrian inheritance.

== Children ==
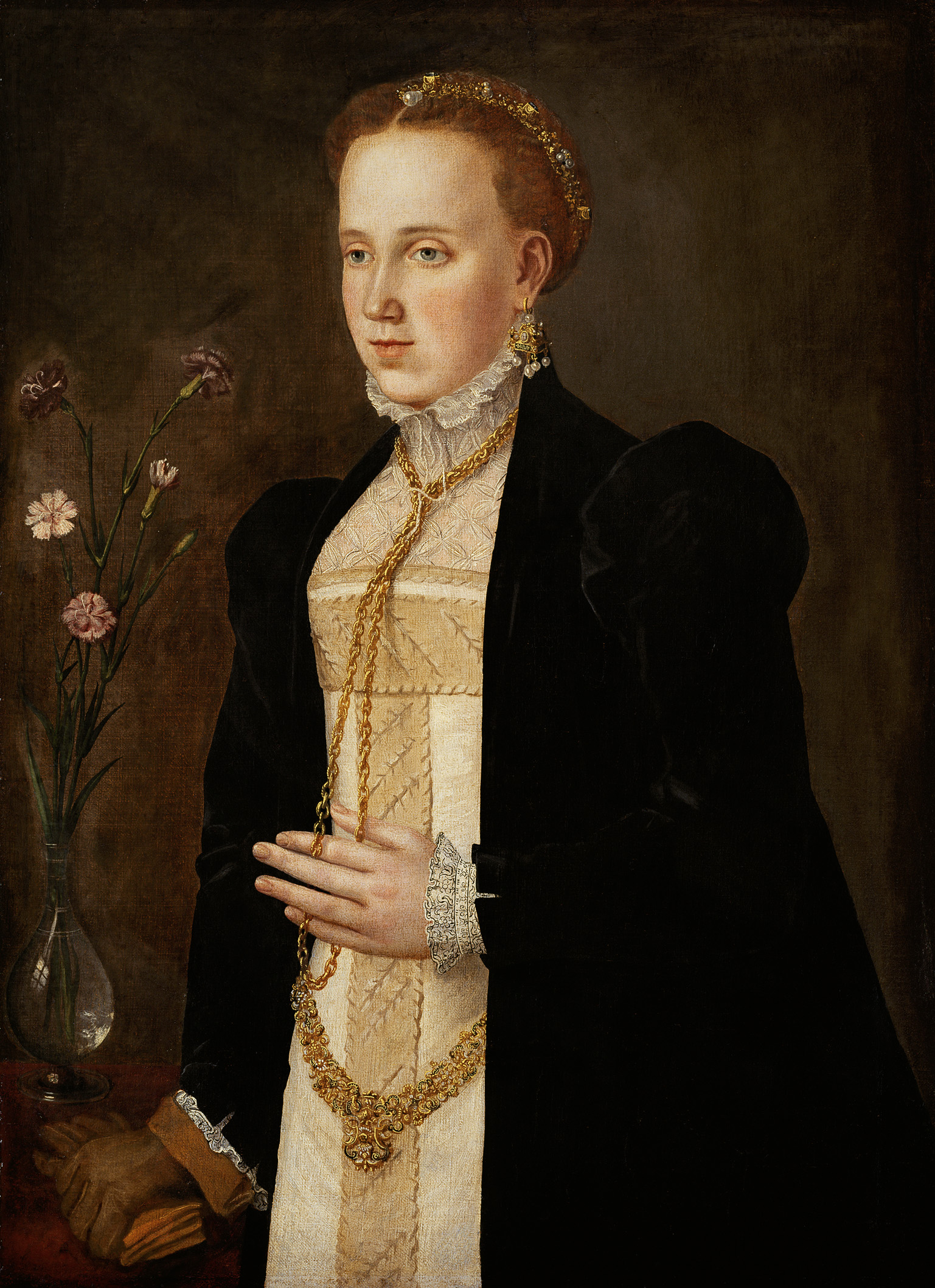
Philippine Welser, Ferdinand's first wife

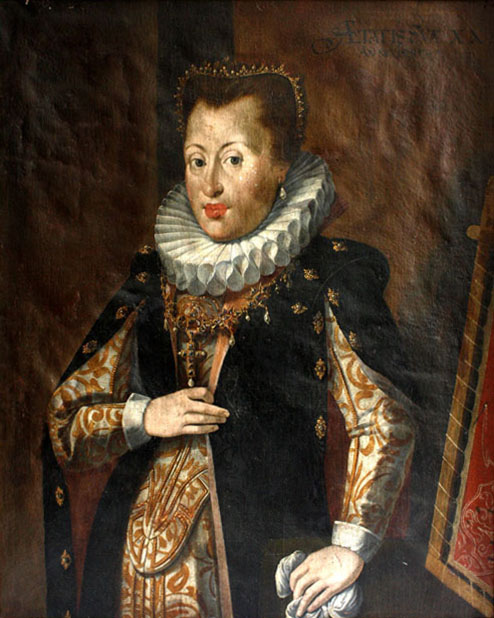
Anne Catherine Gonzaga, Ferdinand's second wife

He and his first wife Philippine Welser were parents of four children:

- Margrave Andrew of Burgau (15 June 1558 – 12 November 1600). Became a cardinal in 1576, Margrave of Burgau in 1578, Bishop of Constance in 1589 and Bishop of Brixen in 1591. He had two illegitimate children.
- Charles, Margrave of Burgau (22 November 1560 – 30 October 1618), Margrave of Burgau. He married his first cousin, Sibylle (1557–1627), the youngest daughter of daughter of William, Duke of Jülich-Cleves-Berg (28 July 1516 – 5 January 1592), and Maria, Archduchess of Austria, daughter of Ferdinand I, Holy Roman Emperor. They had no legitimate children. He and his mistress Chiara Elisa di Ferrero had three illegitimate children.
- Philip of Austria (7 August 1562 – 9 January 1563), twin of Maria.
- Maria of Austria (7 August 1562 – 25 January 1563), twin of Philip.

On 14 May 1582, Ferdinand married his niece Anna Caterina Gonzaga. She was a daughter of William I, Duke of Mantua, and Eleonora of Austria, younger sister of Ferdinand. They were parents to three daughters:

- Archduchess Anna Eleonore of Austria (26 June 1583 – 15 January 1584).
- Archduchess Maria of Austria (16 June 1584 – 2 March 1649), a nun.
- Archduchess Anna of Austria (4 October 1585 – 14 December/15 December 1618); married her first cousin Matthias, Holy Roman Emperor.

He had at least two illegitimate children:

With Anna von Obrizon:

- Veronika von Villanders (1551–1589). Married Giovan Francesco di Gonzaga-Novellara, Lord of Campitello.

With Johanna Lydl von Mayenburg:

- Hans Christoph von Hertenberg (c. 1592 – 2 September 1613). Married Ursula Gienger.

== Ancestors ==
Ancestors of Ferdinand II of Austria

8. Maximilian I, Holy Roman Emperor
4. Philip I of Castile
9. Mary, Duchess of Burgundy
2. Ferdinand I, Holy Roman Emperor
10. Ferdinand II of Aragon
5. Joanna I of Castile
11. Isabella I of Castile
1. Ferdinand II, Archduke of Further Austria
12. Casimir IV Jagiellon
6. Vladislaus II of Bohemia and Hungary
13. Elisabeth of Austria
3. Anne of Bohemia and Hungary
14. Gaston de Foix, Count of Candale
7. Anne of Foix-Candale
15. Catherine of Foix

== Male-line family tree ==
House of Habsburg

Original line
Albert; Count of Habsburg c. 1188–1239
Rudolf I of Germany c. 1218–1291
Albert I of Germany; 1255–1308 | Hartmann; 1263–1281 | Rudolf II; Duke of Austria; 1270–1290
Rudolf I of Bohemia; 1281–1307 | Frederick the Fair c. 1289–1330 | Leopold I Duke of Austria; 1290–1326 | Albert II; Duke of Austria; 1298–1358 | Henry the Friendly; 1299–1327 | Otto; Duke of Austria; 1301–1339 | John; Parricida c. 1290–1312/1313
Albertinian line | Leopoldian line
Rudolf IV; Duke of Austria; 1339–1365 | Frederick III; 1347–1362 | Albert III; Duke of Austria; 1349–1395 | Leopold III; Duke of Austria; 1351–1386 | Frederick II; Duke of Austria; 1327–1344 | Leopold II; Duke of Austria; 1328–1344
Albert IV; Duke of Austria; 1377–1404 | William; Duke of Austria c. 1370–1406 | Leopold IV; Duke of Austria; 1371–1411 | Ernest; Duke of Austria; 1377–1424 | Frederick IV; Duke of Austria; 1382–1439
Albert II of Germany; 1397–1439 | Frederick III; HRE; 1415–1493 | Albert VI; Archduke of Austria; 1418–1463 | Sigismund; Archduke of Austria; 1427–1496
Ladislaus the Posthumous; 1440–1457 | Maximilian I HRE; 1459–1519
Philip I of Castile; 1478–1506
Spanish / Iberian line | Austrian / HRE line
Charles V HRE; 1500–1558 | Ferdinand I HRE; 1503–1564
Philip II of Spain; 1527–1598 | Maximilian II; HRE; 1527–1576 | Ferdinand II; Archduke of Austria; 1529–1595 | Charles II; Archduke of Austria; 1540–1590
Carlos; Prince of Asturias; 1545–1568 | Philip III of Spain; 1578–1621 | Rudolf II; HRE; 1552–1612 | Ernest of Austria; 1553–1595 | Matthias; HRE; 1557–1619 | Maximilian III; Archduke of Austria; 1558–1618 | Albert VII; Archduke of Austria; 1559–1621 | Wenceslaus; Archduke of Austria; 1561–1578 | Andrew; Margrave of Burgau; 1558–1600 | Charles; Margrave of Burgau; 1560–1618 | Ferdinand II; HRE; 1578–1637 | Maximilian Ernest of Austria; 1583–1616 | Leopold V Archduke of Austria; 1586–1632 | Charles of Austria; 1590–1624
Philip IV of Spain; 1605–1665 | Charles of Austria; 1607–1632 | Ferdinand of Austria; 1609–1641 | John-Charles of Austria; 1605–1619 | Ferdinand III; HRE; 1608–1657 | Leopold Wilhelm of Austria; 1614–1662 | Ferdinand Charles; Archduke of Austria; 1628–1662 | Sigismund Francis; Archduke of Austria; 1630–1665
Balthasar Charles; Prince of Asturias; 1629–1646 | Charles II of Spain; 1661–1700 | Ferdinand IV; King of the Romans; 1633–1654 | Leopold I HRE; 1640–1705 | Charles Joseph of Austria; 1649–1664
Joseph I HRE; 1678–1711 | Charles VI; HRE; 1685–1740
Lorraine
Maria Theresa; HRE; 1740–1780 | Francis I HRE; 1745–1765
Habsburg-Lorraine
Joseph II; HRE; 1765–1790 | Leopold II; HRE; 1790–1792
Francis II; HRE; 1792–1806

== Notes ==
| Preceded by Ferdinand I | Archduke of Further Austria; 1564–1595 | Succeeded by Rudolph II who allowed succession by: Mathias, Archduke of Further Austria governor appointed by Mathias: Maximilian III, Archduke of Austria |
