= Capuchin Church, Vienna =

Religious establishment in Austria

Capuchin Church
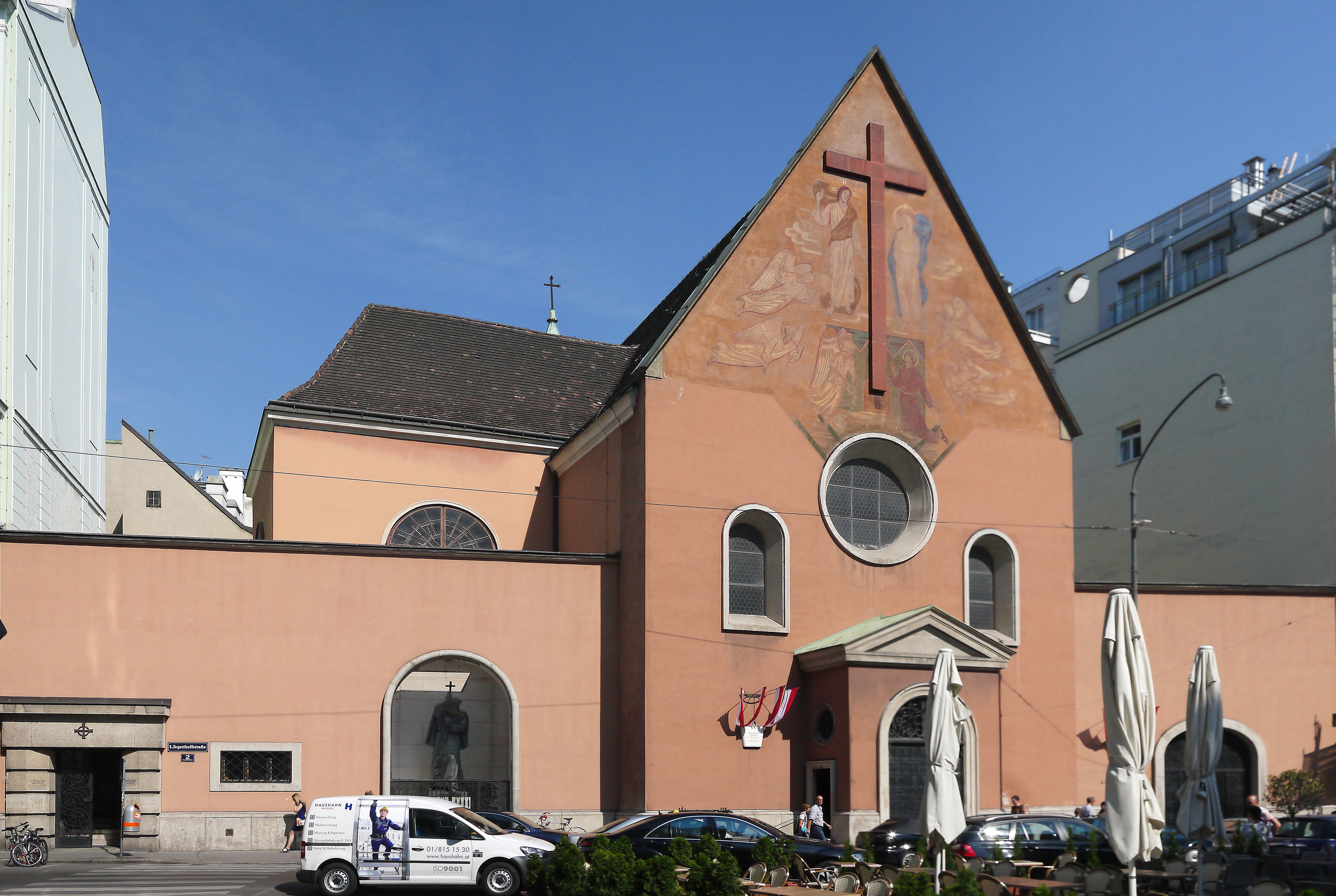
- Capuchin Church, Neuer Markt, Vienna, Austria

- Location within Vienna Location within Austria

Religion
- Affiliation: Roman Catholic
- Ecclesiastical or organisational status: Active
- Leadership: P. Albert Michelitsch OFMCap
- Year consecrated: 1632

Location
- Location: Vienna, Austria
- Coordinates: 48°12′20″N 16°22′11″E

Architecture
- Type: Church
- Completed: 1632

Specifications
- Direction of façade: SE
- Length: 35 m (115 ft)
- Width: 16 m (52 ft)
- Width (nave): 10 m (32.8 ft)

Website
- kapuziner.org

The Capuchin Church (German: Kapuzinerkirche) in Vienna, Austria, is a Roman Catholic church and monastery run by the Order of Friars Minor Capuchin. Located on the Neuer Markt square in the Innere Stadt near the Hofburg Palace, the Capuchin Church is most famous for containing the Imperial Crypt, the final resting place for members of the House of Habsburg. The official name is the Church of Saint Mary of the Angels.

== History ==
Around 1599, the Capuchin brothers under Lawrence of Brindisi resided at Vienna on their way to Prague, where they had been sent by Pope Clement VIII in the course of the Counter-Reformation. The church was donated by the will of Anna of Tyrol (1585–1618), consort of Holy Roman Emperor Matthias of Habsburg. Construction was delayed due to the outbreak of the Thirty Years' War and was not finished until 1632, under the rule of Matthias' successor, Ferdinand II. It was consecrated in 1632.

The aisleless church contains the tombs of friar Marco d'Aviano (d. 1699) and architect Donato Felice d'Allio (1761) as well as a pietà by Peter Strudel. Its subterranean mausoleum is the Imperial Crypt (German: Kaisergruft, though usually called Capuchin Crypt, German: Kapuzinergruft) that has been the principal place of entombment for the Habsburg dynasty, emperors of the Holy Roman Empire, and their descendants.

The lying in repose for the last heir to the Austrian and Hungarian throne, Otto von Habsburg, took place in a side chapel on 15 July 2011.

The façade of the Capuchin Church building was restored in 2016, removing the line dividing the colors and strengthening the colors.

== Imperial Crypt ==
The Capuchin Church contains the Imperial Crypt (German: Kaisergruft), also called the Capuchin Crypt (Kapuzinergruft), a burial chamber beneath the church and monastery. Since 1633, the Imperial Crypt has been the principal place of entombment for members of the House of Habsburg. The bodies of 145 Habsburg royalty, plus urns containing the hearts or cremated remains of four others, are deposited here, including 12 emperors and 18 empresses. The most recent entombment was in 2011. The visible 107 metal sarcophagi and five heart urns range in style from puritan plain to exuberant rococo. Some of the dozen resident Capuchin friars continue their customary role as the guardians and caretakers of the crypt, along with their other pastoral work in Vienna.

== Gallery ==
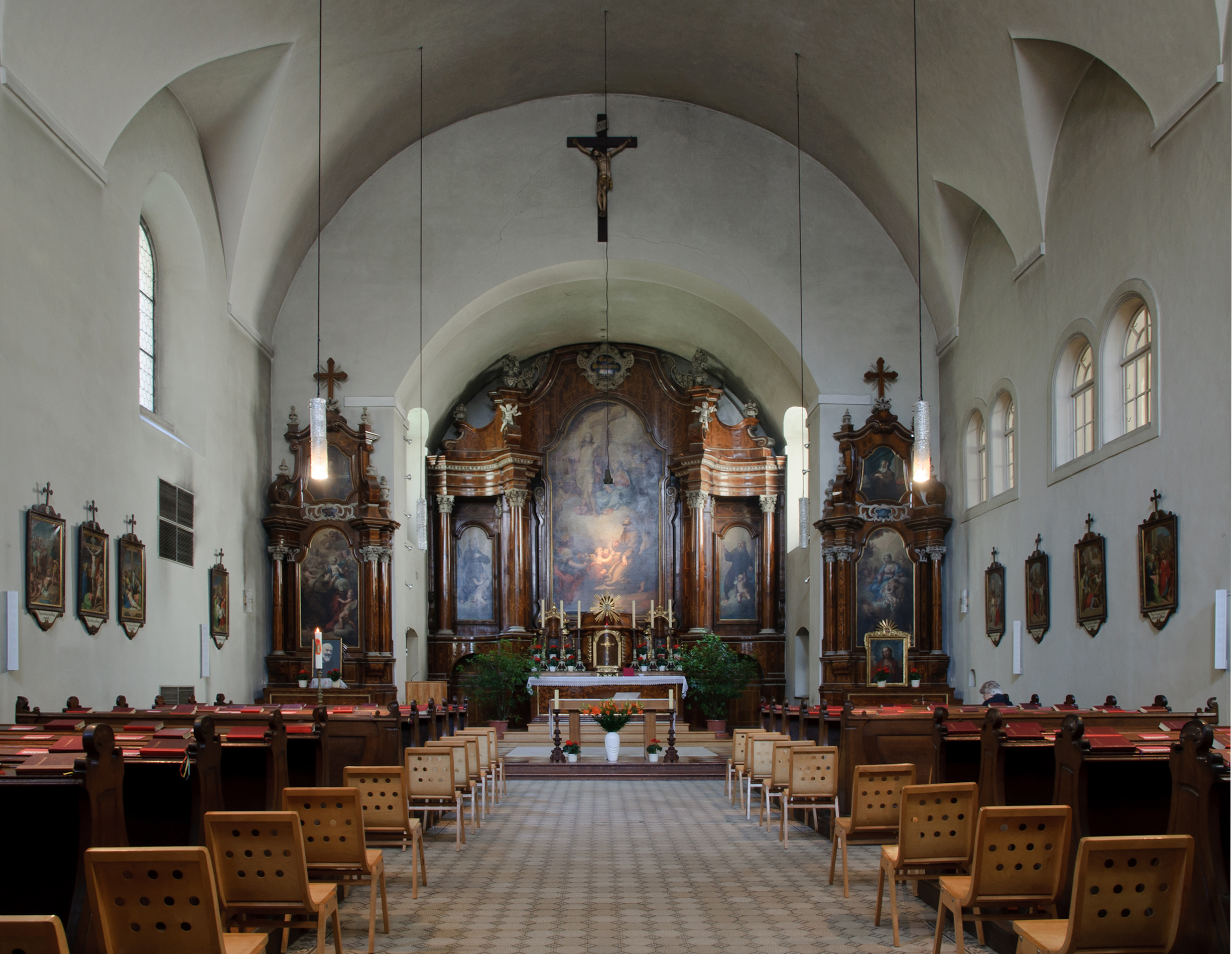
Capuchin Church interior

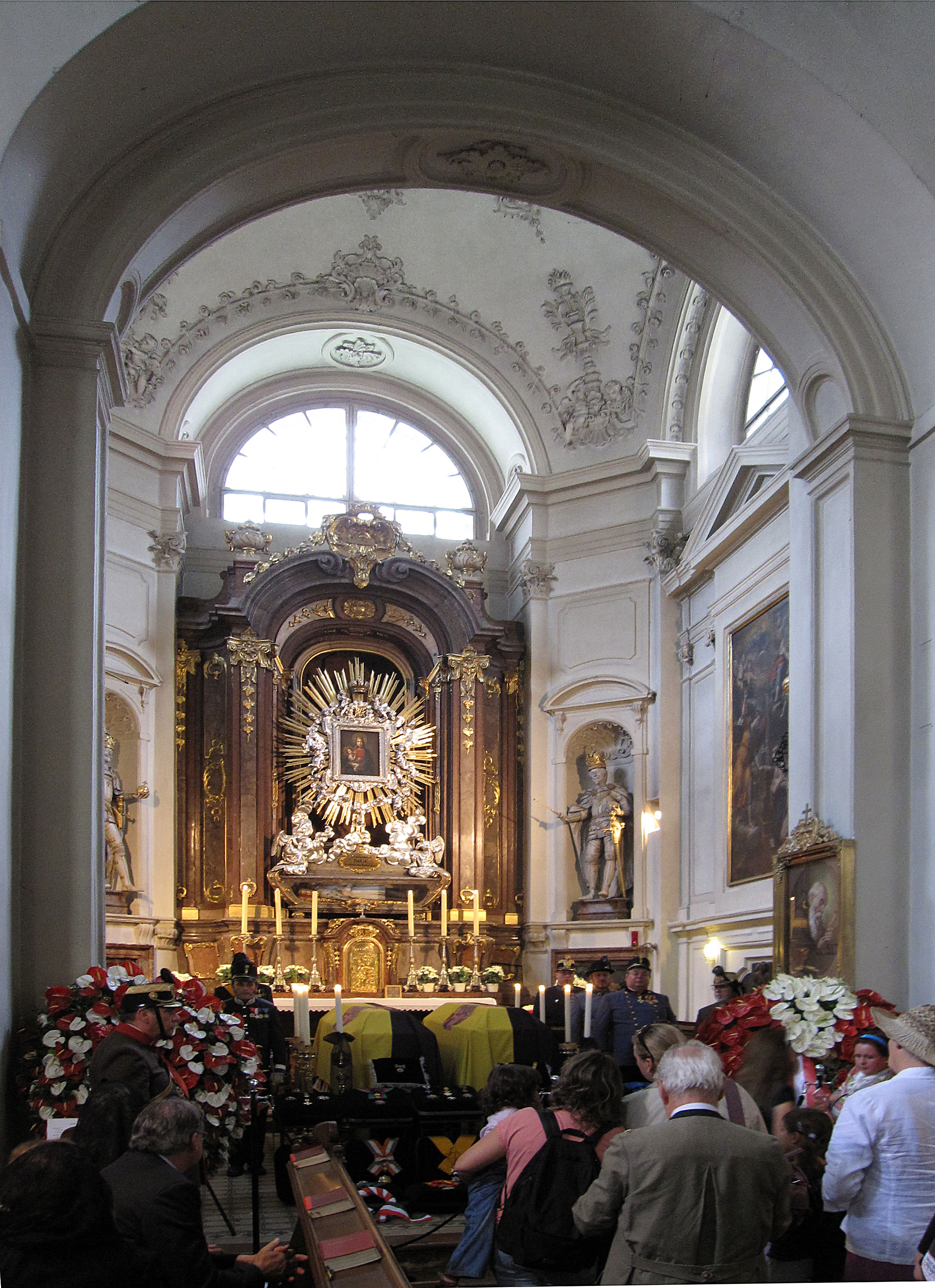
Otto von Habsburg lying in repose

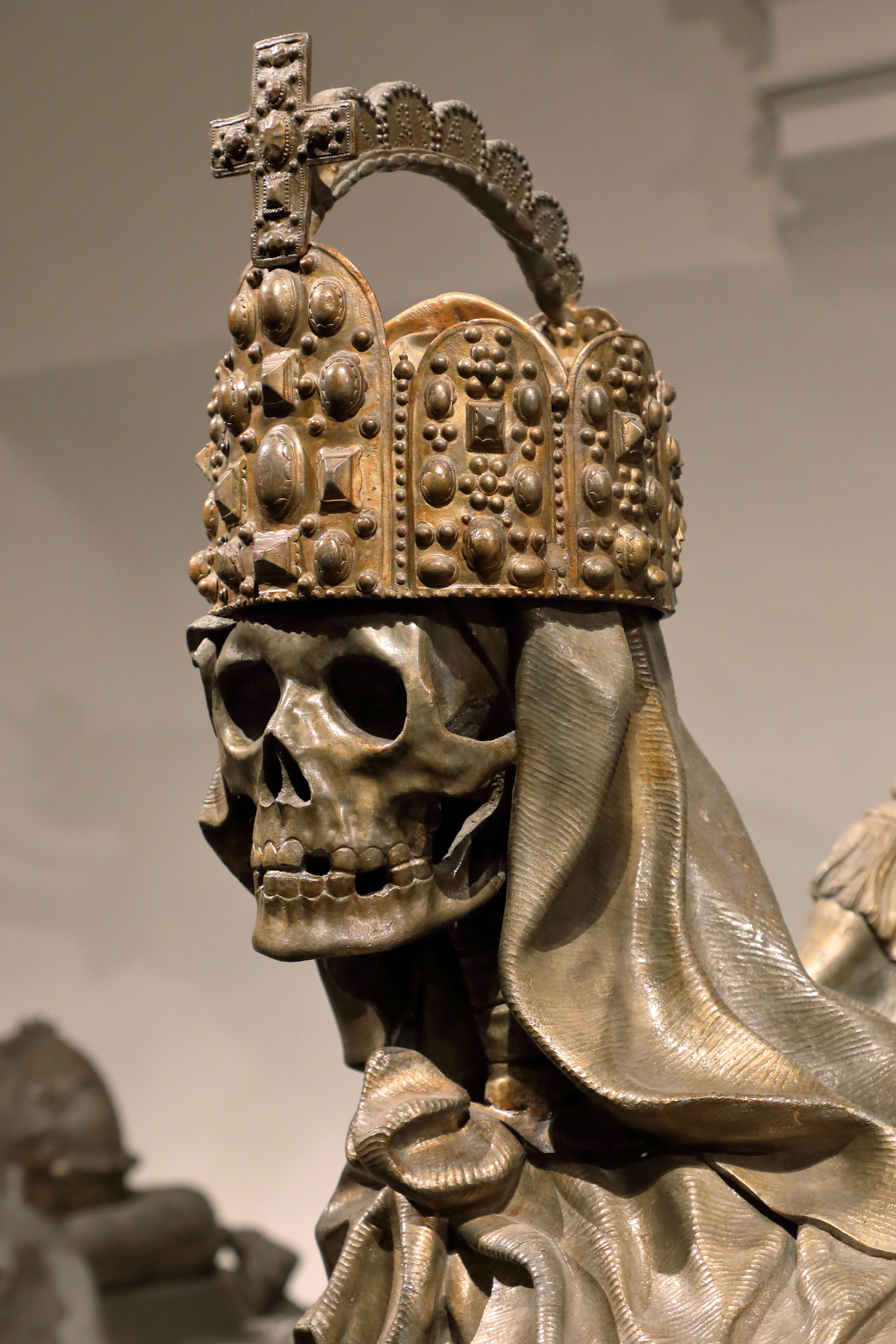
An ornament of the sarcophagus of Emperor Charles VI

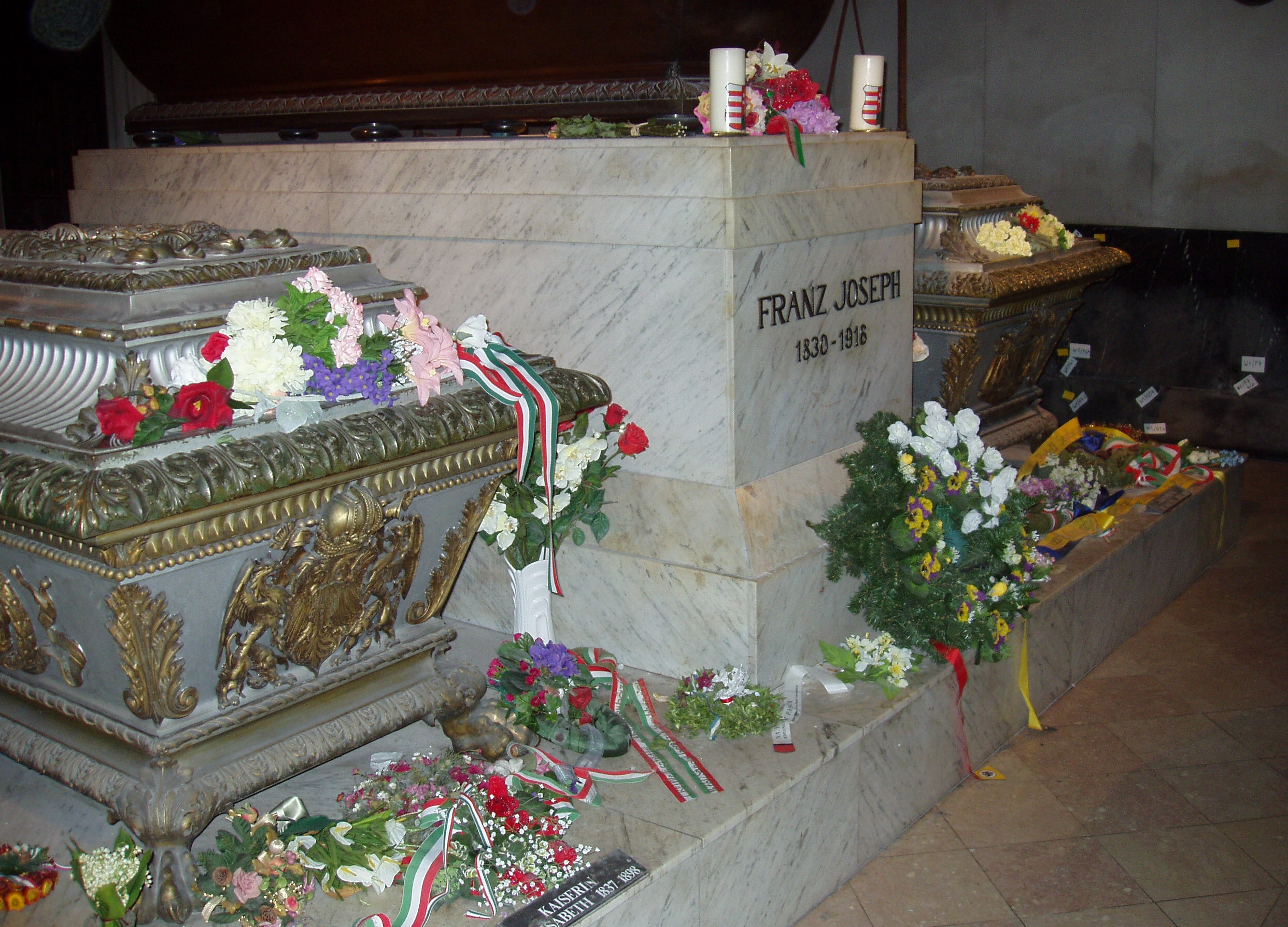
Tomb of Franz Joseph I, flanked by his wife Elisabeth and son Rudolf

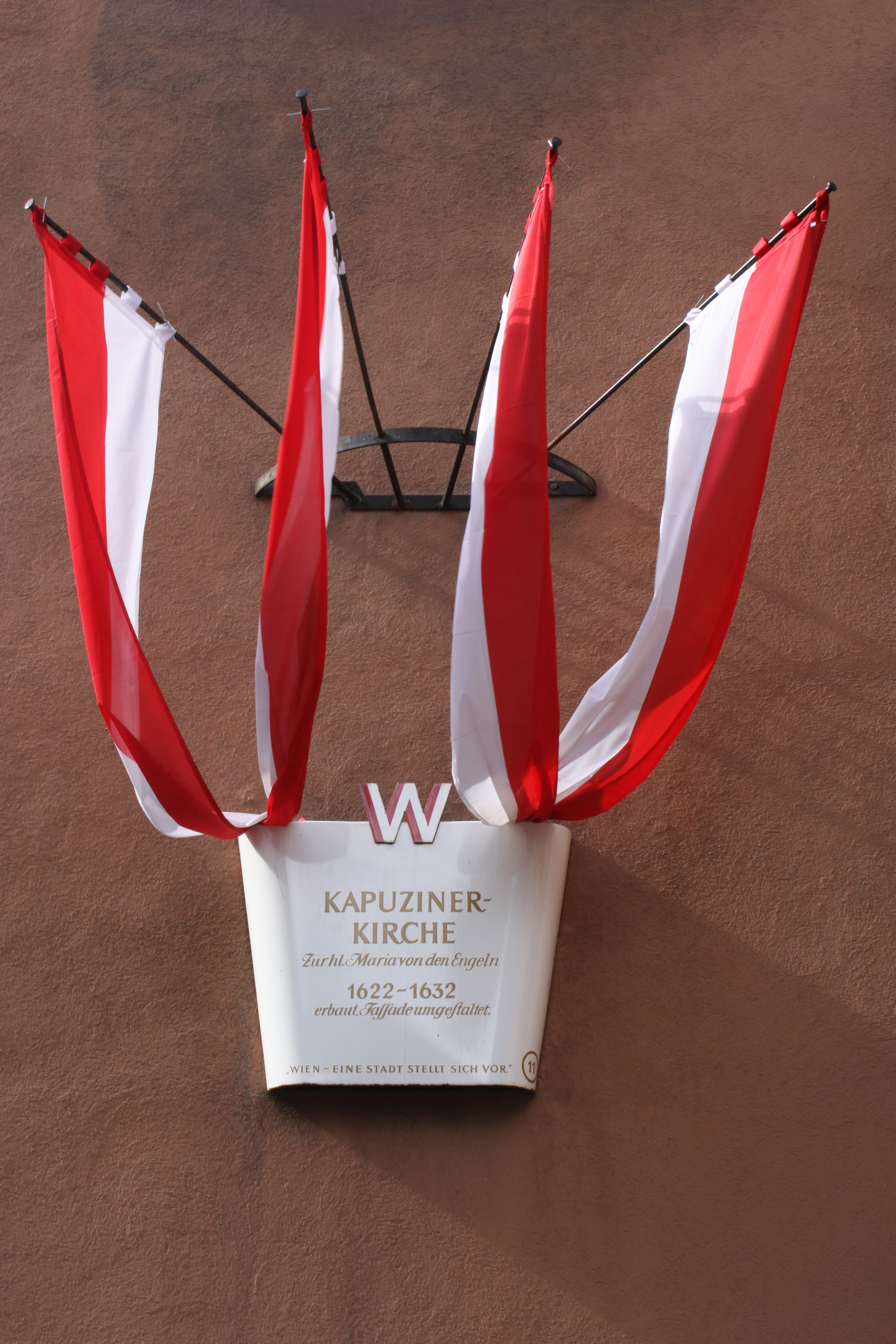
Capuchin Church information plate
