= Archduchess Eleanor of Austria =

Duchess of Mantua and Montferrat from 1561 to 1587

Eleanor of Austria
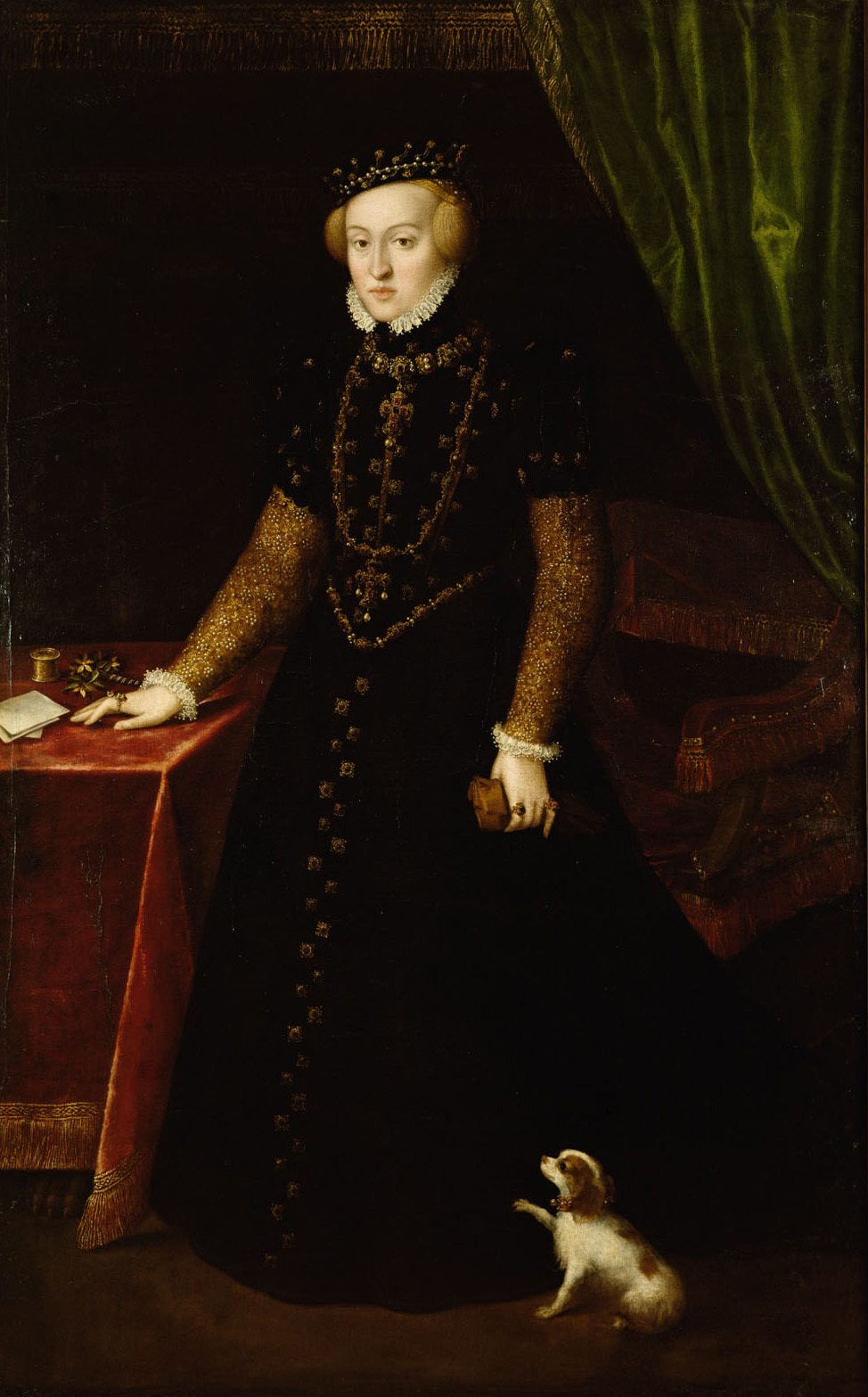

Duchess consort of Mantua and Montferrat
- Tenure: 26 April 1561 – 14 August 1587
- Born: 2 November 1534; Vienna, Archduchy of Austria, Holy Roman Empire
- Died: 5 August 1594 (aged 59); Mantua, Duchy of Mantua
- Spouse: William I, Duke of Mantua (m. 1561; died 1587)
- Issue: Vincent I, Duke of Mantua; Margherita, Duchess of Ferrara; Anna Caterina, Archduchess of Austria
- House: Habsburg
- Father: Ferdinand I, Holy Roman Emperor
- Mother: Anna of Bohemia and Hungary

Archduchess Eleanor of Austria (2 November 1534 – 5 August 1594) was Duchess of Mantua by marriage to William I, Duke of Mantua. She was the daughter of Ferdinand I, Holy Roman Emperor and Anna of Bohemia and Hungary.

== Life ==
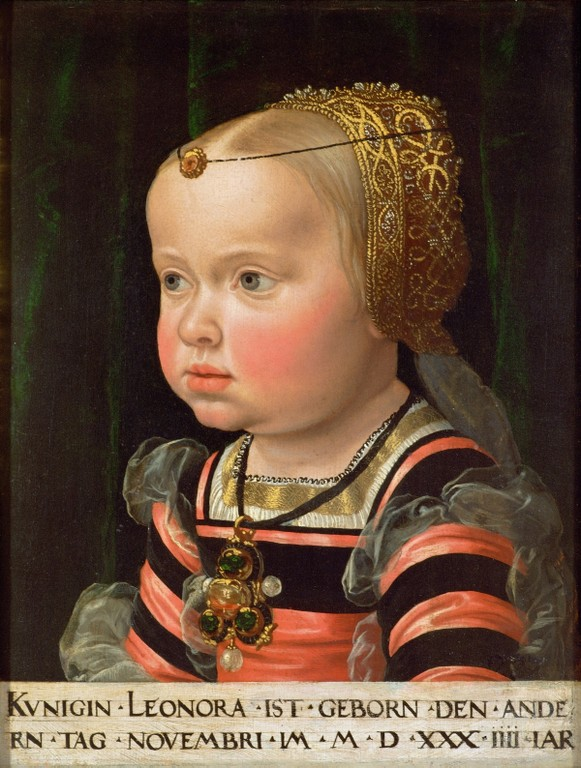
Eleanor as a child

Eleanor was the eighth child and sixth daughter out of fifteen children born to King Ferdinand of Bohemia and Hungary (before his succession as Holy Roman Emperor) and his wife Anna of Bohemia and Hungary. She was a sister of Johanna of Austria, who married Francesco I de' Medici, thus making Eleonora the aunt of Marie de' Medici, Queen of France.

=== Life in Mantua ===
She married William I, Duke of Mantua on 26 April 1561.

At about age five, Eleanor's daughter Anne Caterina became severely ill and nearly died. She contracted a high fever and her extremities began to swell. For two years she was ill. Finally Eleanor and William appealed to the Virgin Mary with deep prayer, promising to raise Anne as a child of Mary if she lived on. Soon Anne became healthy again. Eleanor and William told their daughter of the Virgin Mary's intervention on her behalf and the promise they had made. From there out Eleanor educated and guided Anne Catherine in the cultivation of devotion to Mary. Throughout childhood Anne Catherine displayed a consistent sense of piety.

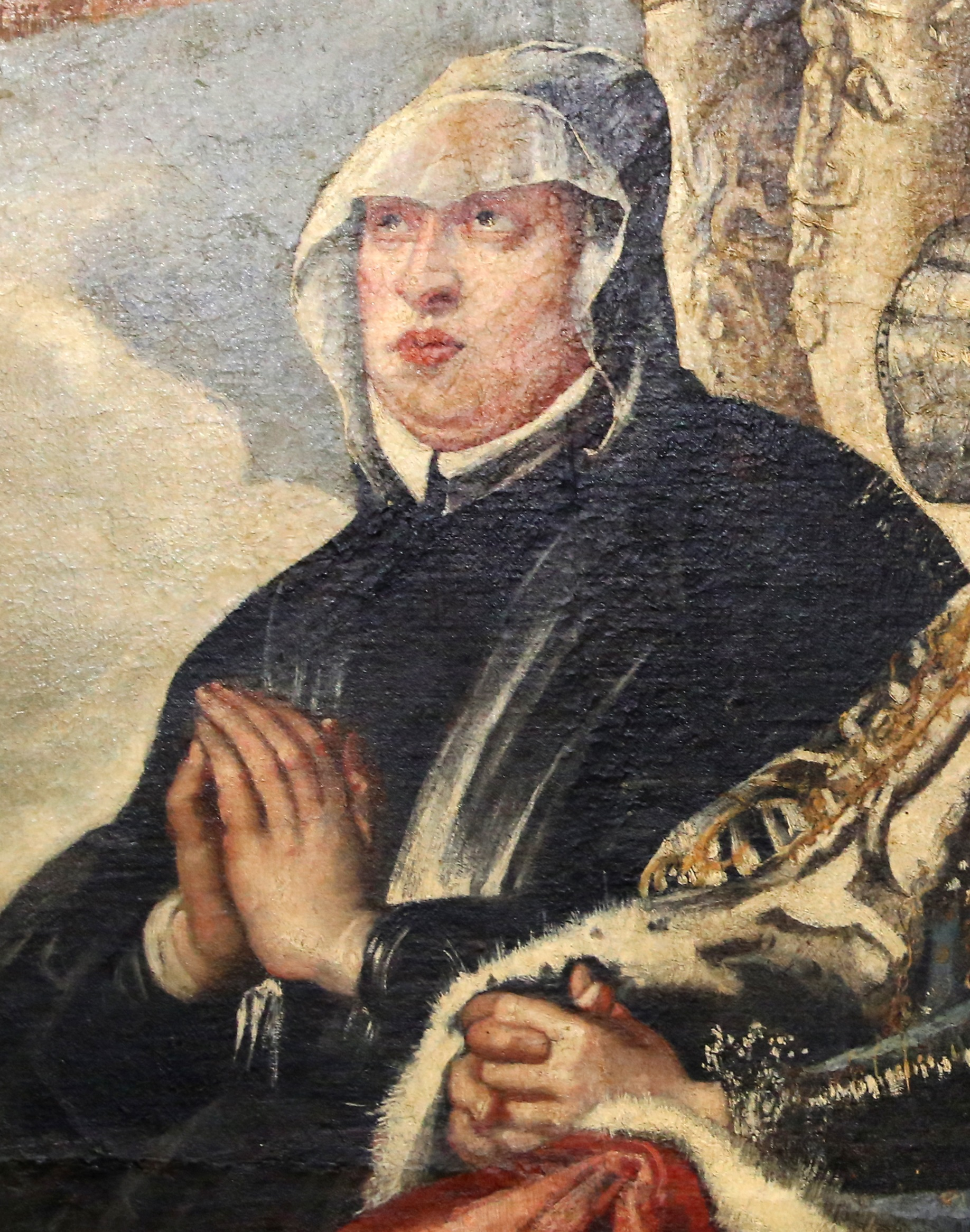
Eleanor as a widow, detail of The Gonzaga Family in Adoration of the Holy Trinity, c. 1604-1605, Ducal Palace, Mantua

Eleonor died on 5 August 1594 at the age of 59, she had been a widow since 1587 when her husband died. She was one of the last children of Ferdinand and Anna alive at the time, the only other sibling alive at the time of her death was her brother Ferdinand II, Archduke of Austria who died only one year later.

== Issue ==
Her children were:

- Vincent I, Duke of Mantua (21 September 1562 – 9 February 1612). Married Eleonora de' Medici (Eleanor's niece).
- Margherita Barbara Gonzaga (27 May 1564 – 6 January 1618). Married Alfonso II d'Este.
- Anna Caterina Gonzaga (17 January 1566 – 3 August 1621). Married her maternal uncle Ferdinand II, Archduke of Austria.

== Ancestors ==
Ancestors of Archduchess Eleanor of Austria

8. Maximilian I, Holy Roman Emperor
4. Philip I of Castile
9. Mary, Duchess of Burgundy
2. Ferdinand I, Holy Roman Emperor
10. Ferdinand II of Aragon
5. Joanna I of Castile
11. Isabella I of Castile
1. Eleanor of Austria
12. Casimir IV Jagiellon
6. Vladislaus II of Bohemia and Hungary
13. Elisabeth of Austria
3. Anne of Bohemia and Hungary
14. Gaston de Foix, Count of Candale
7. Anne of Foix-Candale
15. Catherine of Foix
