= Matthias, Holy Roman Emperor =

Holy Roman Emperor from 1612 to 1619

Matthias
- Imperator Romanorum
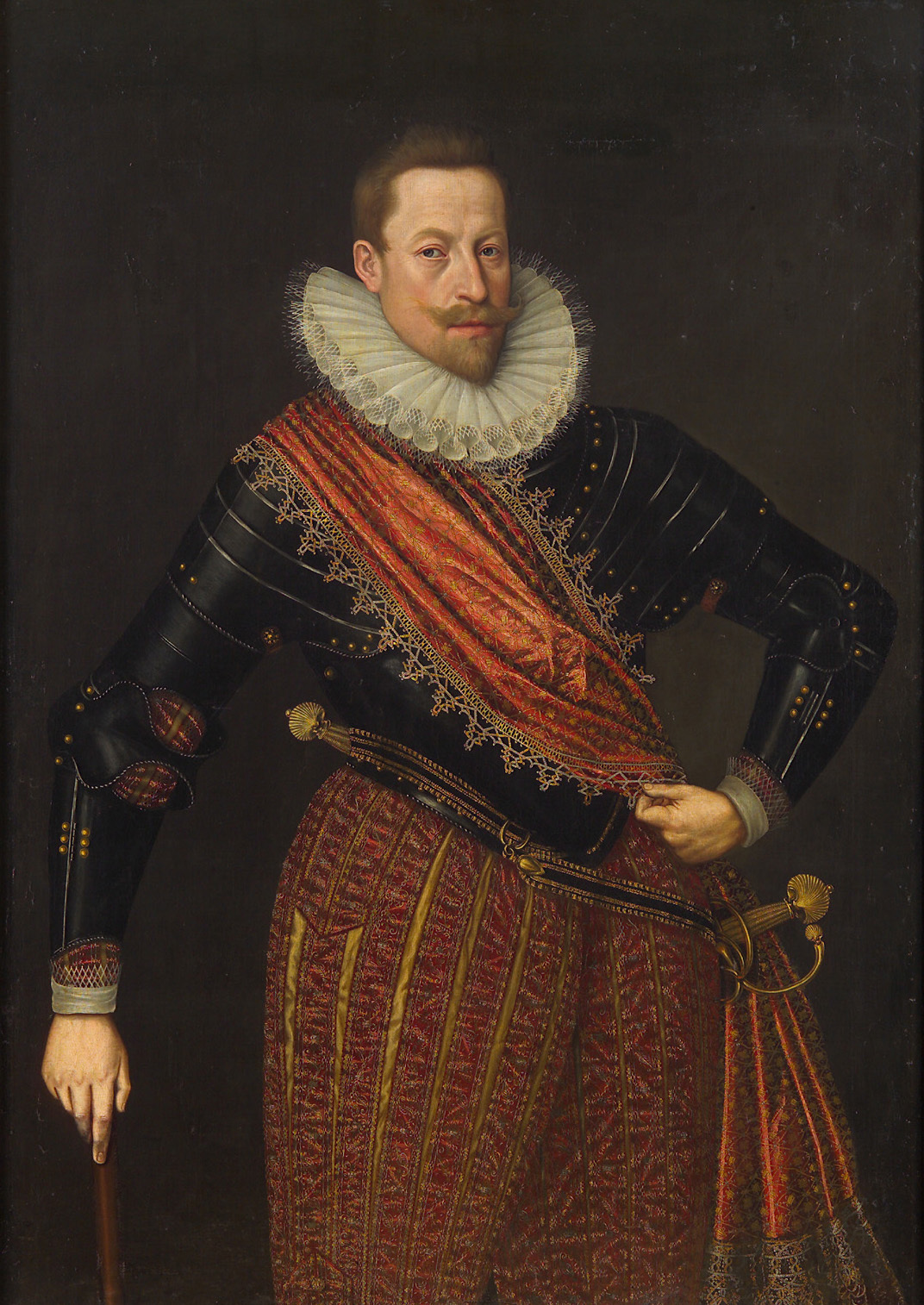
- Portrait by Lucas van Valckenborch, 1583

Holy Roman Emperor
- Reign: 13 June 1612 – 20 March 1619
- Coronation: 26 June 1612, Frankfurt Cathedral
- Predecessor: Rudolf II
- Successor: Ferdinand II
- Born: 24 February 1557; Vienna, Archduchy of Austria, Holy Roman Empire
- Died: 20 March 1619 (aged 62); Vienna, Austria, Holy Roman Empire
- Burial: Imperial Crypt
- Spouse: Anna of Tyrol (m. 1611; died 1618)
- House: Habsburg
- Father: Maximilian II, Holy Roman Emperor
- Mother: Maria of Austria, Holy Roman Empress
- Religion: Catholic Church

Matthias (24 February 1557 – 20 March 1619) was Holy Roman Emperor from 1612 to 1619, Archduke of Austria from 1608 to 1619, King of Hungary and Croatia from 1608 to 1618 and King of Bohemia from 1611 to 1617. His personal motto was Concordia lumine maior ("Unity is stronger in the light").

Matthias played a significant role in the opposition of the Habsburg family against his brother, the Emperor Rudolf II. After gaining power, he showed little political initiative of his own. The course of his politics was determined by Cardinal Melchior Klesl until his fall in 1618. As a consequence of his failed religious and administrative policies, the Bohemian Revolt, the initial theatre of the Thirty Years' War, began during the final year of Matthias' reign.

== Biography ==
=== Early life and family ===
Matthias was born in the Austrian capital of Vienna as the third son of Maximilian II, Holy Roman Emperor and of Maria of Spain. His brothers were Rudolf (who became Emperor Rudolf II), Ernest, Maximilian (from 1585 Grand Master of the Teutonic Order), Albert (archbishop of Toledo, later governor of the Netherlands), and Wenceslaus (Grand Prior of the Order of Malta in Castile). He also had six sisters. His sister Anna was married to King Philip II of Spain and his sister Elisabeth to King Charles IX of France. Almost nothing is known about his upbringing. One of his teachers was the writer and historian Ogier Ghiselin de Busbecq. Upon Maximilian II's death, the family's estates and property were all inherited by Rudolf, the eldest son. The other sons, including Matthias, were compensated with cash pensions and appointments to church or state positions. Matthias married Archduchess Anna of Tyrol, daughter of his uncle Archduke Ferdinand II, Archduke of Austria and became his heir in Further Austria in 1595. The marriage did not produce surviving children.

=== Governor of the Habsburg Netherlands ===
Portrait of Matthias as a child, c. 1560

In 1578, Matthias was invited to the Habsburg Netherlands by the States-General of the rebellious provinces, which offered him the position of Governor-General. Matthias had come into contact with Gautier van der Gracht, the envoy of the Dutch provinces, at the Regensburg Reichstag in 1576. Philippe III de Croÿ, Duke of Aarschot, and other representatives of a rather moderate party agreed with Matthias to make him the governor of the Netherlands against the will of his uncle, Philip II of Spain, the hereditary ruler of the provinces and without the knowledge of Emperor Rudolf II. Matthias accepted the appointment, but the position was not recognised by Philip II. He set down the rules for religious peace within most of the United Provinces. His work is noted in Article 13 of the 1579 Union of Utrecht, which established freedom of religion as a locally determined issue. Matthias continued as titular governor for the rebels until their deposing of Philip II and declaration of full independence in 1581, when he returned home to Austria.

=== Governor of Austria ===
He returned to Austria in 1583, where he settled in Linz with a small household. He made several unsuccessful attempts to get elected as bishop of (Münster, Liège, Speyer). In 1586, negotiations for the succession of Polish King Stephen Báthory were equally unsuccessful. He also applied for the regency in Tyrol and Further Austria. It was only after his brother Ernest was appointed General Governor in the Habsburg Netherlands in 1593, where he ruled from 1594, that Matthias secured governance over Austria.

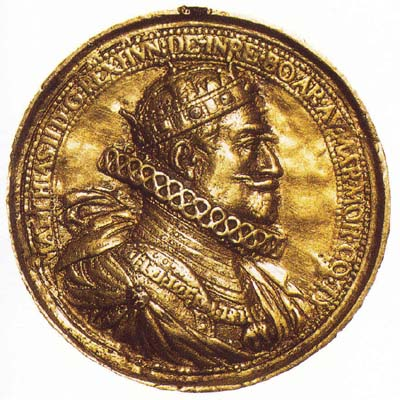
Coronation medal of Matthias as King of Hungary

He was immediately confronted with the vigorous advocacy of their religious rights among the Protestant estates. The problems were exacerbated by the high taxes and the troops who were raised as a result of the Long Turkish War. In 1595 and 1597, the farmers in Lower and Upper Austria revolted in the hope of negotiating with the emperor. Matthias forced the insurgents into submission with mercenary troops.

After the uprising had been quelled, Matthias's policies on religion changed. If there had been Protestants at his court, he now went on a strict Counter-Reformation course. His chancellor had been Melchior Khlesl, bishop and administrator of Wiener Neustadt from 1599 and a supporter of the Counter-Reformation. Matthias appointed him in 1594 to 1595 and again in 1598 to 1600 as nominal commander in chief in the Turkish War and as his representative to the Hungarian Diet.

=== Power struggle among Habsburg brothers ===
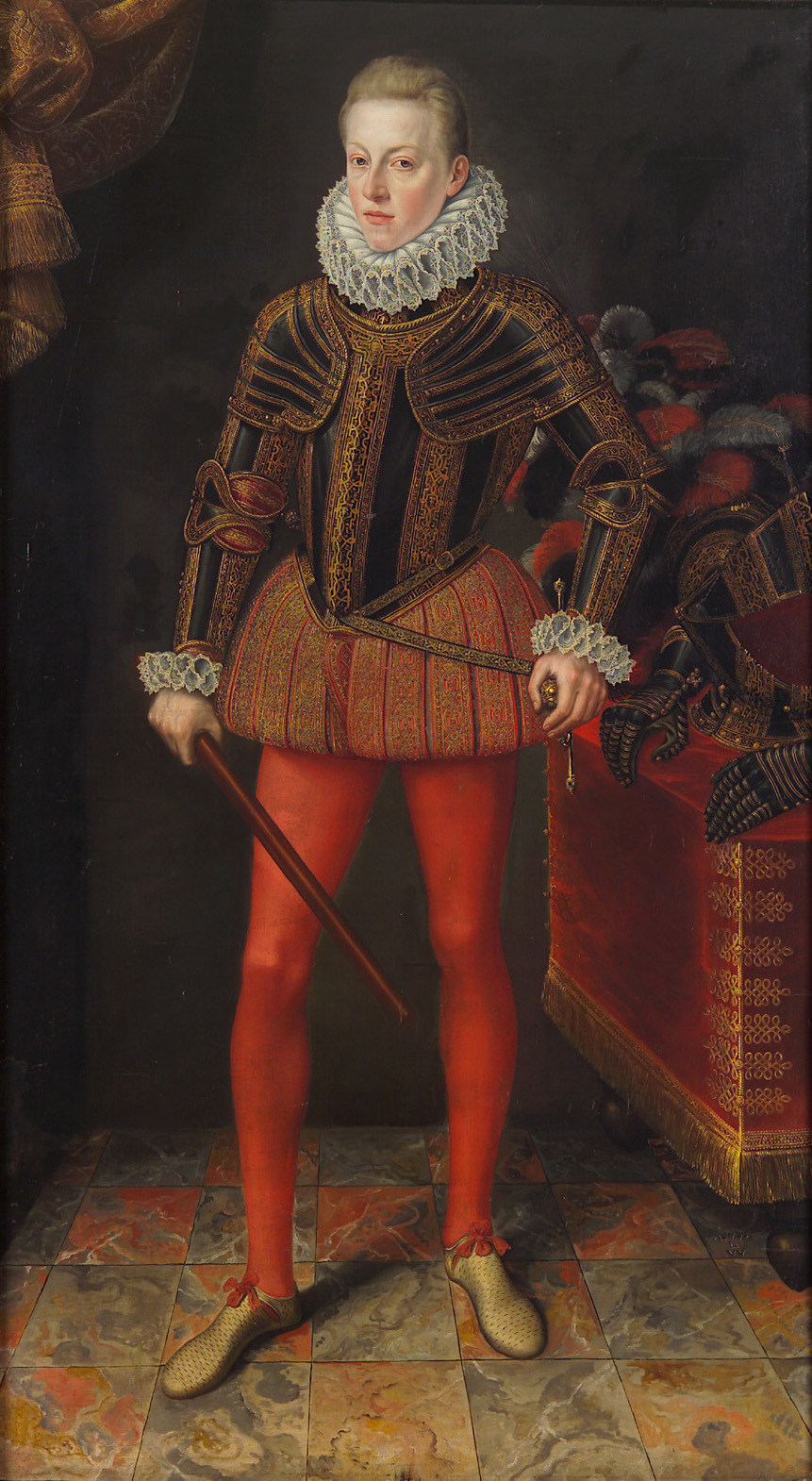
Matthias portrait as Archduke in armour and general's staff, by Lucas van Valckenborch, 1579

With great concern, the Habsburgs observed the increasing psychological decline of the ageing emperor. After Ernest's death in 1595, Matthias became the oldest archduke. From 1599 onward, Matthias in vain urged the childless emperor to arrange his succession, as Matthias was rejected. The crisis carried on in 1604 during the uprising of Stephen Bocskai in Hungary. Matthias initially avoided an argument with the emperor, but Bishop Klesl urged him to take command in the Brothers' Quarrel with Rudolf. In November 1600 at Schottwien, Archdukes Matthias, Maximilian and Ferdinand signed an agreement of concerted opposition against the emperor. In 1606, they declared Rudolf insane (document dated 25 April), appointed Matthias as the head of the family and began to oust Rudolf. It was Matthias, not the emperor, who had brokered the Peace of Zsitvatorok with the Ottomans and in 1606 had ended the conflict in Hungary by granting freedom of religion in Hungary and guaranteed the right of Transylvania to elect its own independent princes in the future.

As unrest resurfaced in Hungary and spread into parts of Moravia and Austria, Matthias attempted to use the opposition in the power struggle against the emperor. He joined the rebellious Diet of Hungary and the Lower and Upper Austrian estates in Pressburg in 1608 and in Moravia shortly later. In April 1608, Matthias marched on Prague and besieged the city. Although he could not fully win over the Bohemian estates, he forced Rudolf to negotiate and to sign a peace treaty in June 1608, which unsurprisingly resulted in the redistribution of power. Rudolf kept Bohemia, Silesia and Lusatia, and Matthias received Hungary, Austria and Moravia.

However, the takeover of power did not proceed according to customary protocol. Matthias, as the new sovereign, had not guaranteed the privileges of the estates before they officially paid homage to him. He tried to reverse the order, which led to the so-called Homage Dispute. As most of the estates were Protestant in Austria and Moravia, their nobles then formed the powerful Horner Confederation (Horner Bund) and paid homage only after a guarantee of their religious rights. The Horner Confederation continued to exist until the beginning of the Thirty Years' War.

=== Sovereign rule ===
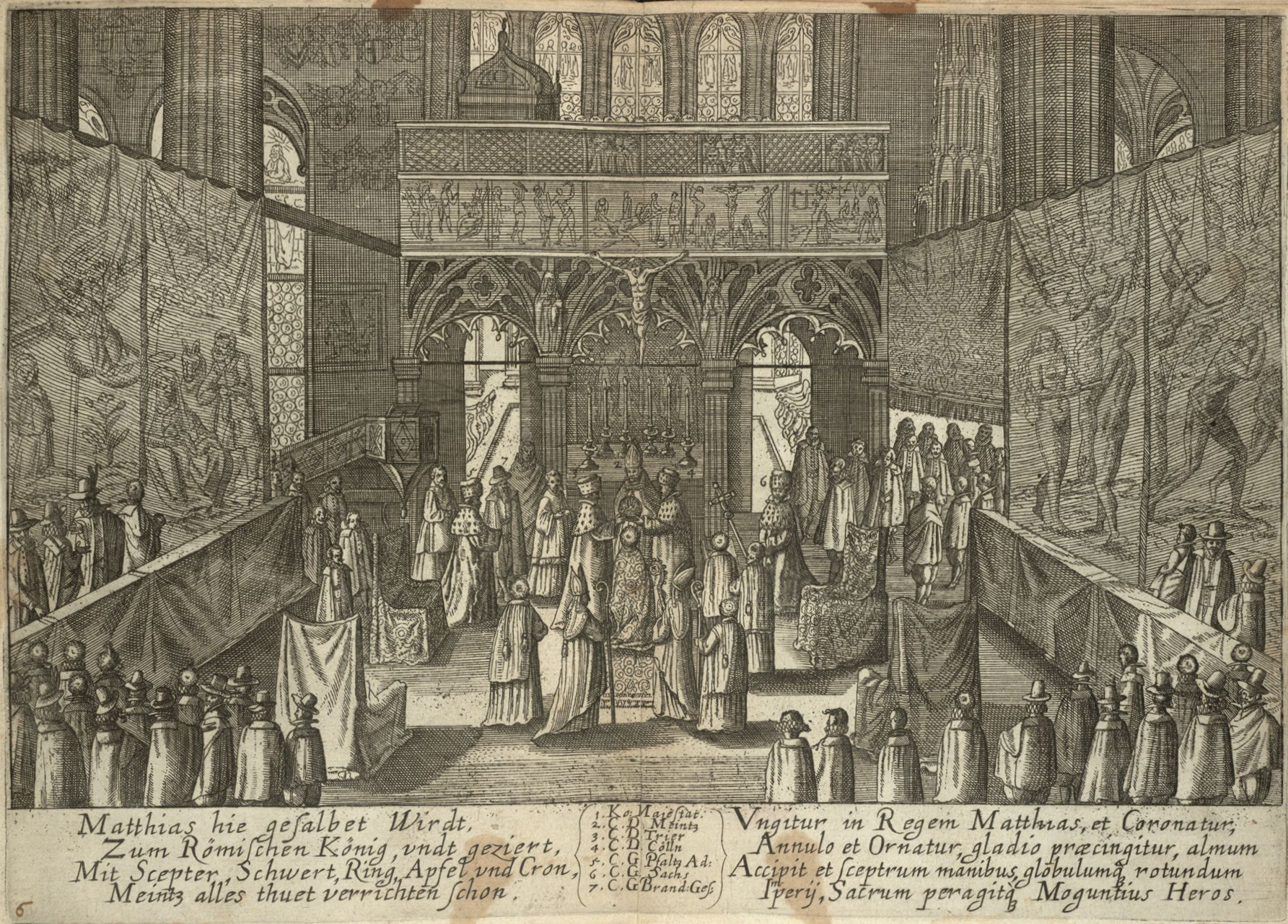
Imperial coronation of Matthias in Frankfurt, 1612

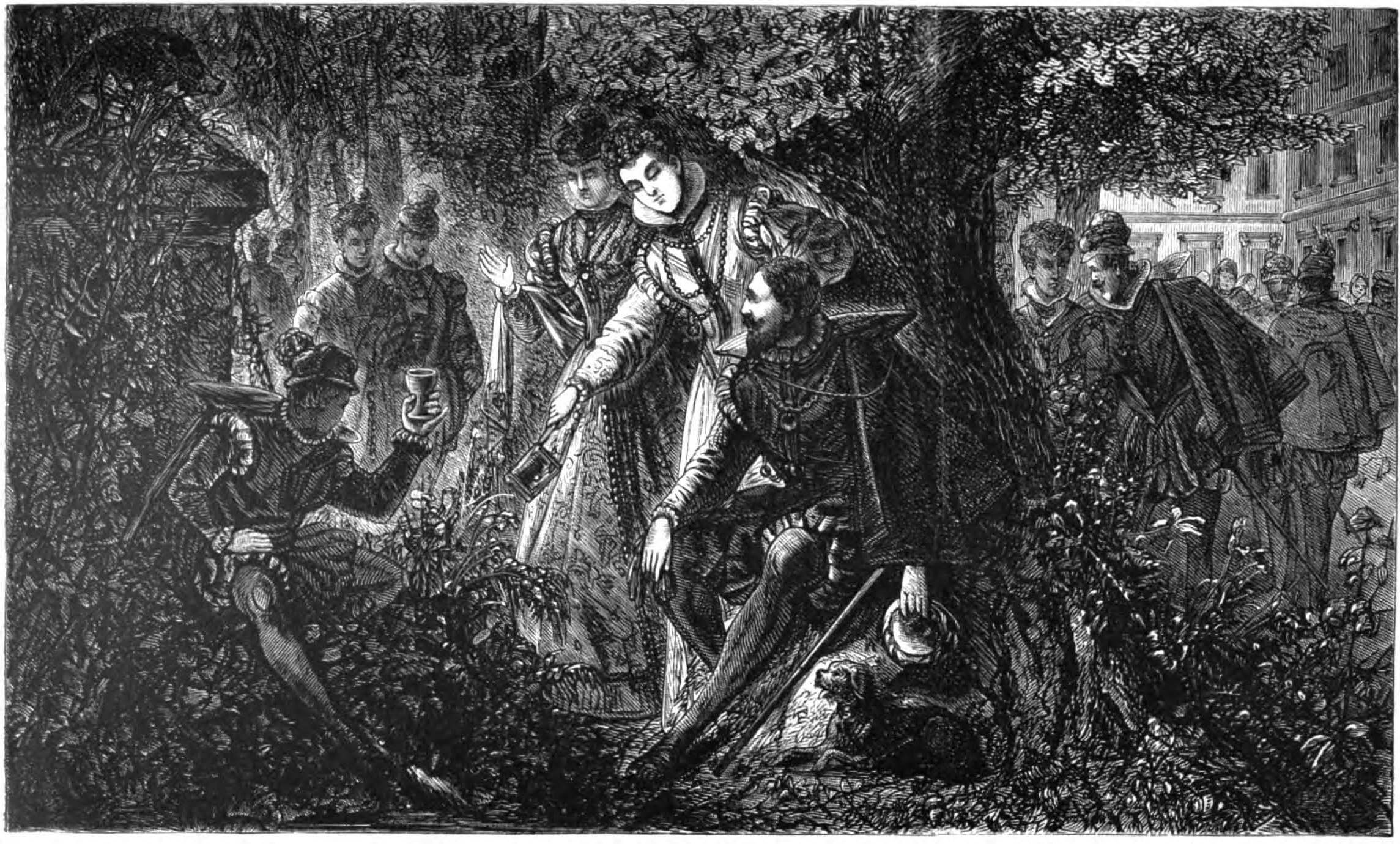
Emperor Matthias at the Beautiful Spring (Schöner Brunnen)

Matthias was crowned King of Bohemia on 23 May 1611 and was, after Rudolf's death on 20 January 1612, elected Holy Roman Emperor. On 4 December 1611, he married his cousin Archduchess Anna of Austria, but the union failed to produce children. Matthias allegedly fathered an illegitimate son, Matthias of Austria, by an unknown mother.

The court and the administration were gradually moved from Prague to Vienna after 1612. The new emperor was less interested in art than Rudolf II had been, and most court artists soon turned their backs on his court. Matthias maintained, however, a close relationship with the painter Lucas van Valckenborch. For the private crown of his brother Rudolf II, he had a sceptre and an orb made. The emperor's wife founded the Capuchin Church and the Imperial Crypt in Vienna as the future burial site of the Habsburg family. Matthias had allegedly found a spring in the area of today's Schönbrunn Palace. It is said that it became the eponymous name of the area and the palace from his remark: "Look, what a beautiful spring" (beautiful: schön, spring: Brunn[en]).

After Matthias's imperial accession, his kingship was dominated by Klesl, who hoped to bring about a compromise between Catholic and Protestant states within the Holy Roman Empire to strengthen the empire. Matthias had already been forced to grant religious concessions to Protestants in Austria and Moravia, as well as in Hungary, when he had allied with them against Rudolf. Matthias imprisoned Georg Keglević, the Commander-in-chief, General, Vice-Ban of Croatia, Slavonia and Dalmatia and since 1602 baron in Transylvania, but soon freed again. The Principality of Transylvania was a fully autonomous area of Hungary but under the nominal suzerainty of the Ottoman Empire, where it was the time of the Sultanate of Women.

Matthias's conciliatory policies were opposed by the more intransigent Catholic Habsburgs, particularly Matthias's brother Archduke Maximilian, who hoped to secure the succession for the inflexible Catholic Archduke Ferdinand, who later became Emperor Ferdinand II. The Protestant Bohemians were concerned about their religious freedom and so fiercely opposed all Catholic officials who were appointed by Matthias, particularly Archduke Ferdinand, who was elected King of Bohemia in June 1617. The dispute came to a head in the Bohemian Protestant revolt, which provoked Matthias to imprison Klesl and to revise his policies. However, he was old and ailing and was unable to prevent Maximilian's faction from taking over. He died of natural causes at 62 on 20 March 1619. Ferdinand, who had already been crowned King of Bohemia (1617) and of Hungary (1618), succeeded Matthias as Holy Roman Emperor.

== Burial ==
As the Imperial Crypt at Vienna had not yet been completed, Anna († in 1618) and Matthias († in 1619) were temporarily buried in St. Maria's Queen's Monastery. Not until 1633 would they be transferred to the Imperial Crypt at the Capuchin Church. Emperor Matthias is one of the 41 people who received a "separate burial", as their bodies are distributed among all three traditional Viennese burial sites of the Habsburgs (Imperial Crypt, Herzgruft, Ducal Crypt).

== Names ==
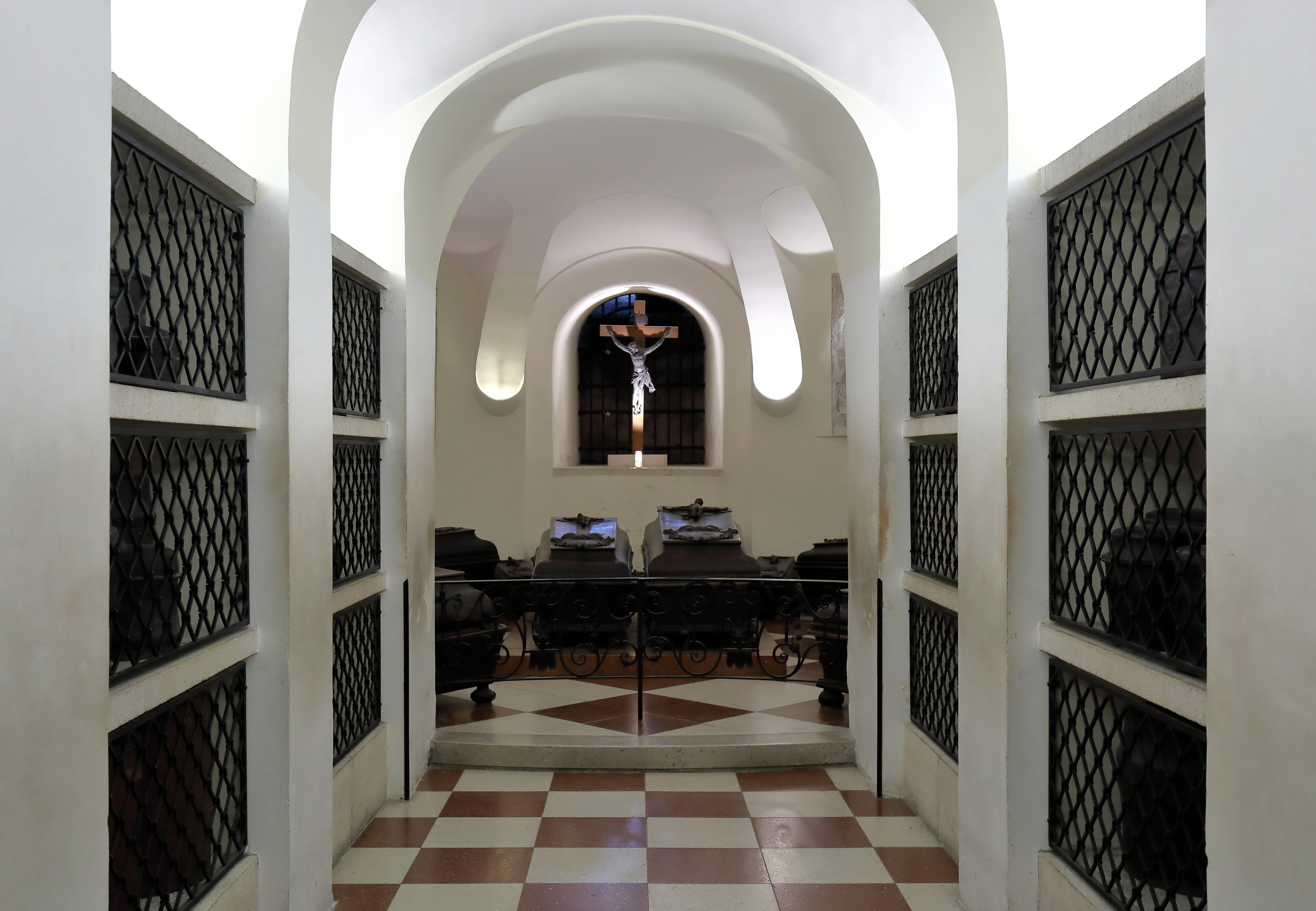
Ducal Crypt at the St. Stephen's Cathedral, Vienna

Names in other languages:

- German: Matthias
- Czech: Matyáš
- Croatian: Matija II.
- Hungarian: II. Mátyás
- Italian: Mattia
- Polish: Maciej
- Romanian: Matia
- Russian: Матвей
- Slovak: Matej
- Slovene: Matija
- Ukrainian: Матвій

== Ancestry ==
Ancestors of Matthias, Holy Roman Emperor

8. Philip I of Castile
4. Ferdinand I, Holy Roman Emperor
9. Joanna of Castile
2. Maximilian II, Holy Roman Emperor
10. Vladislas II of Bohemia and Hungary
5. Anne of Bohemia and Hungary
11. Anne of Foix
1. Matthias, Holy Roman Emperor
12. Philip I of Castile
6. Charles V, Holy Roman Emperor
13. Joanna of Castile
3. Maria of Austria, Holy Roman Empress
14. Manuel I of Portugal
7. Isabella of Portugal
15. Maria of Aragon, Queen of Portugal

== Male-line family tree ==
House of Habsburg

Original line
Albert; Count of Habsburg c. 1188–1239
Rudolf I of Germany c. 1218–1291
Albert I of Germany; 1255–1308	Hartmann; 1263–1281	Rudolf II; Duke of Austria; 1270–1290
Rudolf I of Bohemia; 1281–1307	Frederick the Fair c. 1289–1330	Leopold I Duke of Austria; 1290–1326	Albert II; Duke of Austria; 1298–1358	Henry the Friendly; 1299–1327	Otto; Duke of Austria; 1301–1339	John; Parricida c. 1290–1312/1313
Albertinian line	Leopoldian line
Rudolf IV; Duke of Austria; 1339–1365	Frederick III; 1347–1362	Albert III; Duke of Austria; 1349–1395	Leopold III; Duke of Austria; 1351–1386	Frederick II; Duke of Austria; 1327–1344	Leopold II; Duke of Austria; 1328–1344
Albert IV; Duke of Austria; 1377–1404	William; Duke of Austria c. 1370–1406	Leopold IV; Duke of Austria; 1371–1411	Ernest; Duke of Austria; 1377–1424	Frederick IV; Duke of Austria; 1382–1439
Albert II of Germany; 1397–1439	Frederick III; HRE; 1415–1493	Albert VI; Archduke of Austria; 1418–1463	Sigismund; Archduke of Austria; 1427–1496
Ladislaus the Posthumous; 1440–1457	Maximilian I HRE; 1459–1519
Philip I of Castile; 1478–1506
Spanish / Iberian line	Austrian / HRE line
Charles V HRE; 1500–1558	Ferdinand I HRE; 1503–1564
Philip II of Spain; 1527–1598	Maximilian II; HRE; 1527–1576	Ferdinand II; Archduke of Austria; 1529–1595	Charles II; Archduke of Austria; 1540–1590
Carlos; Prince of Asturias; 1545–1568	Philip III of Spain; 1578–1621	Rudolf II; HRE; 1552–1612	Ernest of Austria; 1553–1595	Matthias; HRE; 1557–1619	Maximilian III; Archduke of Austria; 1558–1618	Albert VII; Archduke of Austria; 1559–1621	Wenceslaus; Archduke of Austria; 1561–1578	Andrew; Margrave of Burgau; 1558–1600	Charles; Margrave of Burgau; 1560–1618	Ferdinand II; HRE; 1578–1637	Maximilian Ernest of Austria; 1583–1616	Leopold V Archduke of Austria; 1586–1632	Charles of Austria; 1590–1624
Philip IV of Spain; 1605–1665	Charles of Austria; 1607–1632	Ferdinand of Austria; 1609–1641	John-Charles of Austria; 1605–1619	Ferdinand III; HRE; 1608–1657	Leopold Wilhelm of Austria; 1614–1662	Ferdinand Charles; Archduke of Austria; 1628–1662	Sigismund Francis; Archduke of Austria; 1630–1665
Balthasar Charles; Prince of Asturias; 1629–1646	Charles II of Spain; 1661–1700	Ferdinand IV; King of the Romans; 1633–1654	Leopold I HRE; 1640–1705	Charles Joseph of Austria; 1649–1664
Joseph I HRE; 1678–1711	Charles VI; HRE; 1685–1740
Lorraine
Maria Theresa; HRE; 1740–1780	Francis I HRE; 1745–1765
Habsburg-Lorraine
Joseph II; HRE; 1765–1790	Leopold II; HRE; 1790–1792
Francis II; HRE; 1792–1806

== Titles ==
Matthias, by the grace of God elected Holy Roman Emperor, forever August, King in Germany, of Hungary, Bohemia, Dalmatia, Croatia, Slavonia, Rama, Serbia, Galicia, Lodomeria, Cumania and Bulgaria, Archduke of Austria, Duke of Burgundy, Brabant, Styria, Carinthia, Carniola, Luxemburg, Württemberg, the Upper and Lower Silesia, Prince of Swabia, Margrave of the Holy Roman Empire, Burgau, Moravia, the Upper and Lower Lusatia, Princely Count of Habsburg, Tyrol, Ferrette, Kyburg, Gorizia, Landgrave of Alsace, Lord of the Wendish March, Pordenone and Salins, etc.

== See also ==
- Kings of Germany family tree. He was related to every other king of Germany.
- Matthias Gate
- Uskok War

Matthias, Holy Roman Emperor House of Habsburg Born: 24 February 1557 Died: 20 March 1619
Regnal titles
Preceded by Rudolf II, Holy Roman Emperor	King of Bohemia; 1611 – 1619	Succeeded by Ferdinand II, Holy Roman Emperor
Preceded by Rudolf II, Holy Roman Emperor	King of Hungary and Croatia; 1608 – 1619	Succeeded by Ferdinand II, Holy Roman Emperor
Preceded by Rudolf II, Holy Roman Emperor	King in Germany; 1612 – 1618	Succeeded by Ferdinand II, Holy Roman Emperor
Preceded by Rudolf II, Holy Roman Emperor	Holy Roman Emperor; 1612 – 1619	Succeeded by Ferdinand II, Holy Roman Emperor
Preceded by Rudolf II, Holy Roman Emperor	Archduke of Austria; 1608 – 1619	Succeeded by Albert VII, Archduke of Austria
Preceded by Ferdinand II, Archduke of Austria	Archduke of Further Austria; 1608 – 1619	Succeeded by Albert VII, Archduke of Austria
