= Archduchess Maria of Austria (1584–1649) =

Austrian archduchess and nun

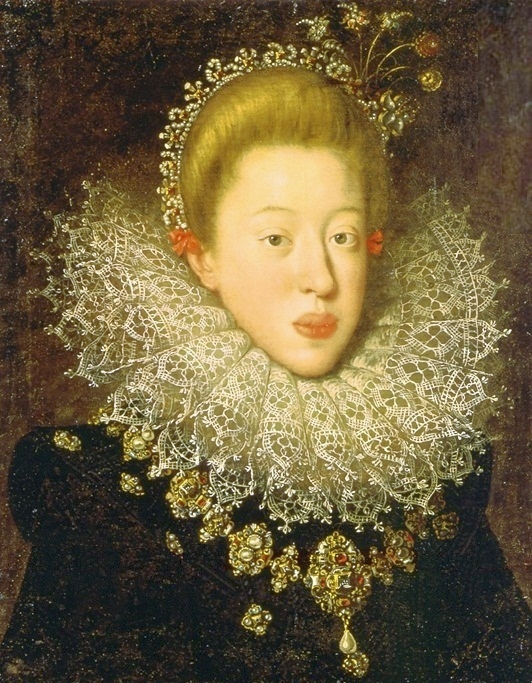
- Archduchess Maria, by Hans von Aachen, c. 1604
- Born: 16 June 1584; Innsbruck, County of Tyrol, Holy Roman Empire
- Died: 2 March 1649 (aged 64); Innsbruck, County of Tyrol, Holy Roman Empire
- House: House of Habsburg
- Father: Ferdinand II, Archduke of Austria
- Mother: Anna Juliana Gonzaga

Archduchess Maria of Austria (German: Erzherzogin Maria von Österreich) (Innsbruck, 16 June 1584 – Innsbruck, 2 March 1649) was the daughter of Ferdinand II, Archduke of Austria and his second wife Anne Juliana Gonzaga. She became a nun, following in the footsteps of her mother, whose side she remained at for the rest of her life. They were buried together in the Church of the Servants of Mary, in Innsbruck.
