= Pacification of Bruck =

Treaty on religious tolerance in Austria in 1578

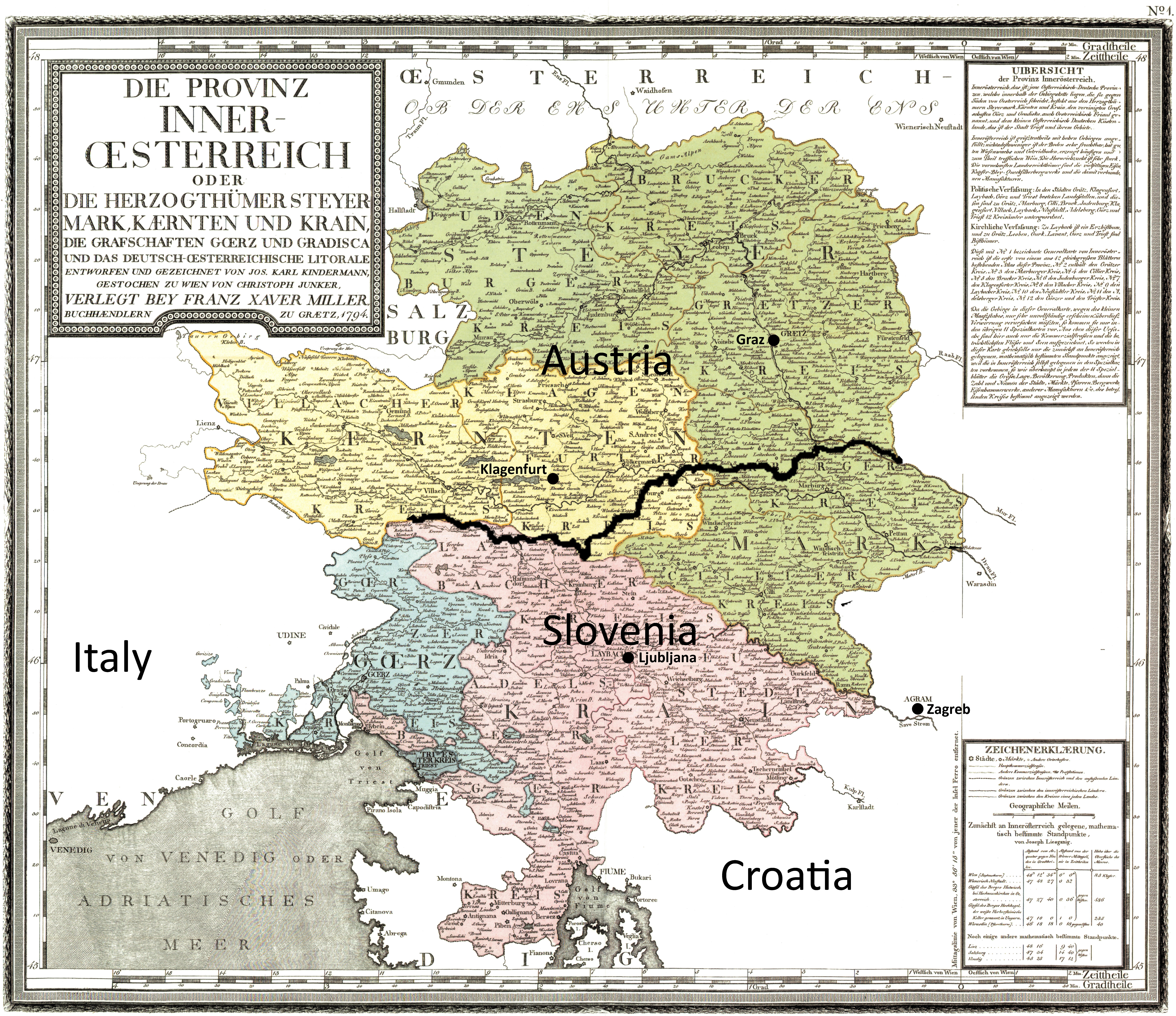
Map of Inner Austria under the Holy Roman Empire. Green: Styria; Yellow: Carinthia; Red: Carniola; Blue: Gorizia. Part of the southern border of modern Austria and modern placenames are shown in black.

The Pacification of Bruck also known as the Libellum of Bruck (German: Das Brucker Libell),was an agreement made between Archduke Charles II, Catholic ruler of Inner Austria and the mostly Protestant Estates at Bruck an der Mur on 9 February 1578, granting a degree of religious tolerance. The concessions were reversed and Protestantism suppressed over the next half century.

== Background ==
Since the beginning of the Reformation in the 1520s, Lutheranism had become well-established in Austria. Its spread was aided by contacts with German cities and universities, by increasing concern about clerical abuses in the Catholic Church, and by the widespread distribution of printed reformist literature. As early as 1525, 1.7 million copies of Luther's writings had been distributed in Europe. The influence was strongest among the more literate classes, particularly the nobility and the burghers, but by no means confined to them. The nobility had a particularly important role, as they were able to use their patronage to appoint Lutheran pastors. The situation was less clear in the cities and markets, many of which were under direct ducal authority, not that of the nobles. Numbers are difficult to assess accurately, but it is thought that by the middle of the century Protestantism had become the majority religion in much of Austria, including Inner Austria.

The Peace of Augsburg in 1555 established the principle of Cuius regio, eius religio, the right of rulers to determine the religion of their subjects. As the Habsburg Archduke Charles was a staunch Catholic, this threatened the future of Protestantism in his lands. This threat was offfset by the need of the rulers for money, made more pressing by the ongoing border wars with the Turks. The greater part of the revenue was raised by taxes levied and collected by the Estates, which were mainly Protestant. There was also a feudal obligation on the nobles to provide military manpower when needed. These constraints led to a series of compromises on religious observance in the Austrian territories, such as that in Graz in 1572.

== The Diet of Bruck ==
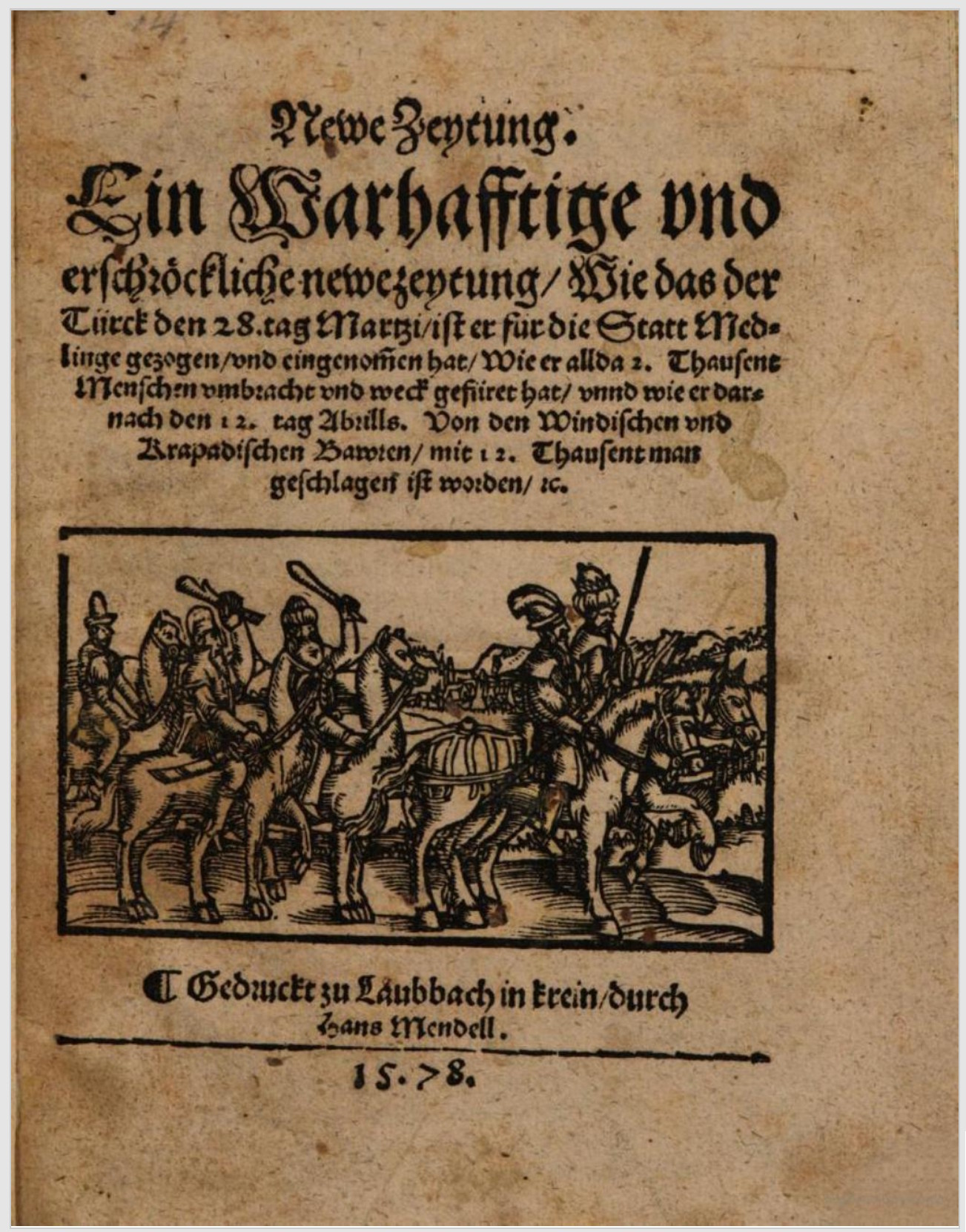
Title page of a pamphlet describing a Turkish attack on Möttling (Metlika) in S.E. Carniola in 1578

There were several Turkish raids into the borderlands in 1576 and 1577, including one by the Martolos into the Windic March in S.E.Carniola which devastated more than 150 villages. Given the need for stronger defences, the Archduke summoned the provincial estates to a Diet on January 1 1578. This took place in Bruck an der Mur because of an outbreak of plague in the provincial capital, Graz. In his opening address, the Archduke emphasised the difficulty of the current situation, with the Turkish enemy making continual advances. Little extra help was to be expected from the Empire, as there ware many other concerns, particularly the possibility of a resumption of war in the Netherlands. Thus Inner Austria must depend on its own resources. He set forward the tasks - to reform the border defences, and to approve funding for the next five years.

The Archduke had tried to avoid religious issues from coming up in the negotiations, but the response from the estates concerned their demands on religious matters. They were being asked to take on a heavy burden. If they were to do so those of the Protestant faith had to participate freely and willingly. Everyone in the country must be "completely untroubled in matters of conscience". A series of specific demands were made, including the right to read the Holy Word at home, to receive sacraments in the Protestant form, and to bury their dead. Particular ire was directed at the Jesuits, who were accused of abusing Protestants as damned heretics, and appropriating church property donated for other ends. The Estates blamed the Jesuits, not the Archduke, as the source of all their grievances. Replying, the Archduke emphasised that slanders and disorders were arising from both sides, and that it was his intention to promote harmony in general. He repeated his opinion that the committees were exceeding their powers, and insisted on his rights in the cities and markets. The committees in their turn insisted that there must be clarification of religious rights, left uncertain by previous initiatives, before they would proceed further.

On 9 February 1578, the Archduke responded. After repeating his demand that slander and defamation should cease, his rights over the cities and markets, and declaring his personal Catholic faith, he gave a verbal undertaking not to burden the citizens' consciences. "I will leave them untroubled in their consciences, they can rely on that" No written confirmation of this assurance was given, but the estates accepted the word of the Archduke. This brought the religious discussions in Bruck to an end.

== Interpretation and legacy ==
At the time, the outcome was seen as a victory for the Protestant estates. During the negotiations, the court chaplain in Judenburg proclaimed from the pulpit "The Turk is the Lutherans' good fortune, otherwise they would be treated differently", and the news of the agreement caused dismay in the papal court. Some later writers have agreed with this interpretation. Albert Henry Newman writes in his Manual of Church History (1903), that the concession (Pacification of Bruck) was extorted from Charles. Much more recently, Robert Bireley (2014) states that the Protestant estates "extorted from the Habsburg Archduke Carl widespread concessions for the practice of Protestantism". On the other hand, Regina Pörtner points out that the Estates were just as threatened by Turkish incursions as the ducal authority, which greatly constrained their actions. The undertaking was unsatisfactory in several ways. There was no written commitment, neither were there any specific guarantees on issues such as establishment of schools and churches. That the estates accepted this was partly an indication of their need for agreement on defence, and partly resulted from an acceptance of the legitimate authority of the ruler, especially in matters of foreign affairs.

In practice there was a considerable degree of toleration, at least for a while. The years following the Pacification have been referred to as "the highwater mark for Protestantism in Inner Austria". Protestant schools were established in the towns of Graz, Judenburg, Klagenfurt and Laibach (Ljubljana); people were not forced to take part in ceremonies that might burden their conscience, and though preachers were still restricted in the towns, people were allowed to worship and receive sacraments in other places. However, the Counter-Reformation was already under way elsewhere, and reaction was not long in coming to Inner Austria. In 1579 Archduke Charles met with Ferdinand II of Tyrol and William V of Bavaria in Munich to discuss ways of reversing the concessions. They agreed that the time was not yet ripe for a direct confrontation, but that the initial approach should be "inconspicuous and indirect". The concessions were to be interpreted as narrowly as possible, only Catholics were to be appointed to public offices, and the activities of preachers were to be curtailed. In 1580, the Protestant printing presses were shut down.

Over the next two decades the power of ducal authority relative to the estates grew for several reasons. Charles increasingly secured sources of revenue independently of the estates, from indirect taxation, from tolls and customs, and by raising loans. This allowed him to hire mercenary troops, reducing the reliance on nobles' feudal service. Charles exploited differences within the Protestant population, both between different sections of the nobility and between the nobility and the towns. Charles died in 1590, and was succeeded by his son Ferdinand who was then 12 years old - he would become Holy Roman Emperor in 1619 as Ferdinand II. During his minority, pressure on the Protestants eased, but in 1596 Ferdinand took full powers as ruler of Inner Austria. Ferdinand regarded himself as an absolute Catholic ruler who had a duty to eliminate heresy, and did not consider himself bound by oral concessions made by his predecessor. In 1698 he banished all Protestant teachers and ministers from his lands, and then ordered all protestant townspeople to adopt the Catholic faith or emigrate. This order we carried out between 1599 and 1601. The declining power of the remaining Protestant nobility and their followers was illustrated by the Second Venetian War (1615-1817), fought almost entirely by mercenary troops. By 1629, the last stage of suppression of Protestantism took place, when nobles were compelled to convert to Catholicism or emigrate.
