= Ferdinand II, Holy Roman Emperor =

Holy Roman Emperor from 1619 to 1637

Ferdinand II
- Imperator Romanorum
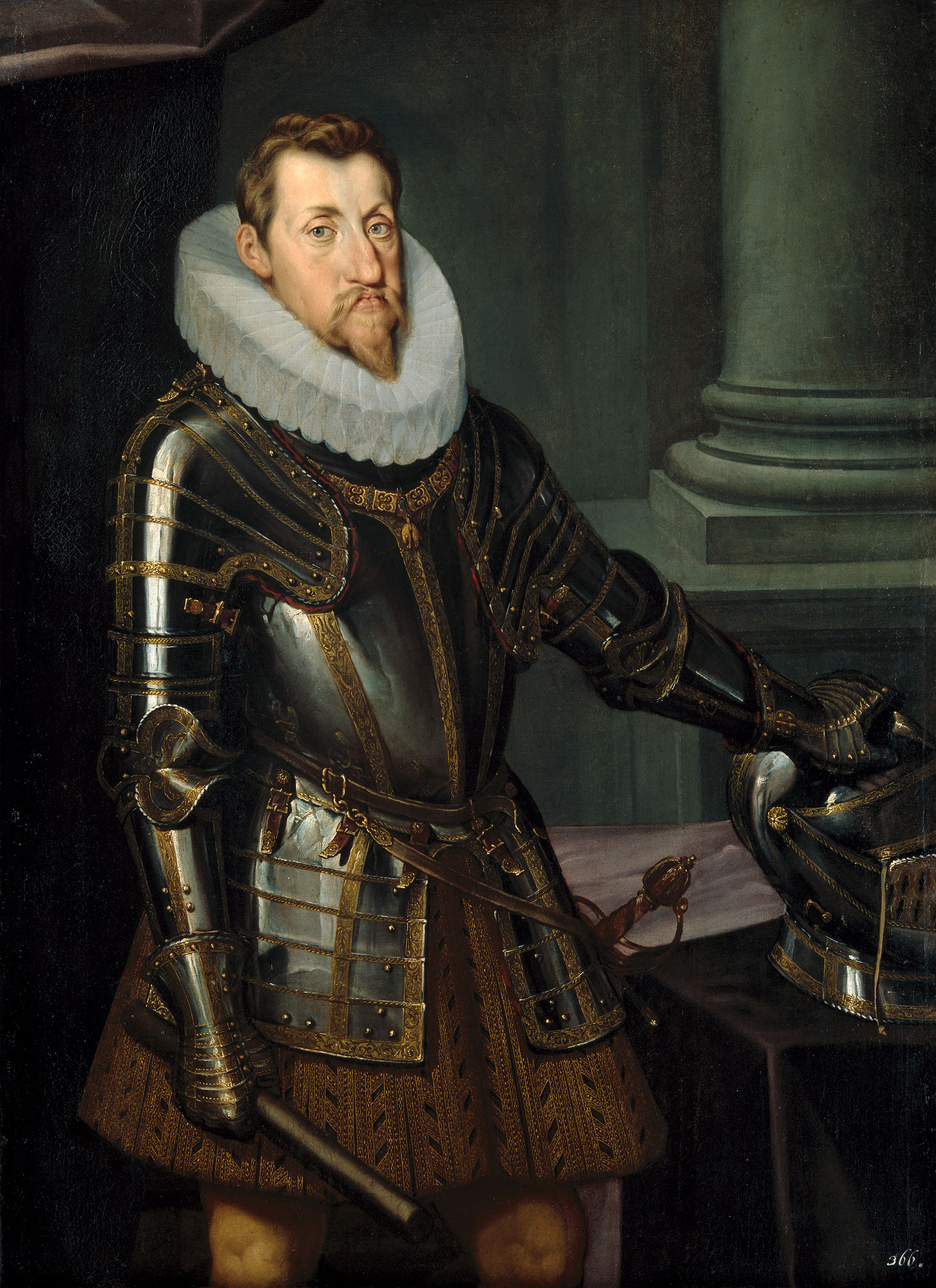
- Portrait of Ferdinand, c. 1614

Holy Roman Emperor
- Reign: 28 August 1619 – 15 February 1637
- Coronation: 9 September 1619; Frankfurt Cathedral
- Predecessor: Matthias
- Successor: Ferdinand III
- Born: 9 July 1578 (NS: 19 July 1578); Graz, Duchy of Styria, Holy Roman Empire
- Died: 15 February 1637 (aged 58); Vienna, Archduchy of Austria, Holy Roman Empire
- Burial: Mausoleum in Graz (body); Augustinian Church (heart)
- Spouses: Maria Anna of Bavaria (m. 1600; died 1616) Eleonora Gonzaga (m. 1622)
- Issue full list...: Ferdinand III, Holy Roman Emperor; Maria Anna, Electress of Bavaria; Cecilia Renata, Queen of Poland; Archduke Leopold Wilhelm
- House: Habsburg
- Father: Charles II, Archduke of Austria
- Mother: Maria Anna of Bavaria
- Religion: Catholic Church

Ferdinand II (9 July 1578 – 15 February 1637) was Holy Roman Emperor, King of Bohemia, Hungary, and Croatia from 1619 until his death in 1637. He was the son of Archduke Charles II of Inner Austria and Maria of Bavaria, who were devout Catholics. In 1590, it was when Ferdinand was 11 years old, they sent him to study at the Jesuits' college in Ingolstadt because they wanted to isolate him from the Lutheran nobles. A few months later, his father died, and he inherited Inner Austria–Styria, Carinthia, Carniola and smaller provinces. His cousin, Rudolf II, Holy Roman Emperor, who was the head of the Habsburg family, appointed regents to administer these lands.

Ferdinand was installed as the actual ruler of the Inner Austrian provinces in 1596 and 1597. Rudolf II also charged him with the command of the defense of Croatia, Slavonia, and southeastern Hungary against the Ottoman Empire. Ferdinand regarded the regulation of religious issues as a royal prerogative and introduced strict Counter-Reformation measures from 1598. First, he ordered the expulsion of all Protestant pastors and teachers; next, he established special commissions to restore the Catholic parishes. The Ottomans captured Nagykanizsa in Hungary in 1600, which enabled them to invade Styria. A year later, Ferdinand tried to recapture the fortress, but the action ended in November 1601 with a defeat, due to the unprofessional command of his troops. During the first stage of the family feud known as the Brothers' Quarrel, Ferdinand initially supported Rudolph II's brother, Matthias, who wanted to convince the melancholic emperor to abdicate, but Matthias' concessions to the Protestants in Hungary, Austria, and Bohemia outraged Ferdinand. He planned an alliance to strengthen the position of the Catholic Church in the Holy Roman Empire, but the Catholic princes established the Catholic League without his participation in 1610.

Philip III of Spain, who was the childless Matthias' nephew, acknowledged Ferdinand's right to succeed Matthias in Bohemia and Hungary in exchange for territorial concessions in 1617. Spain also supported Ferdinand against the Republic of Venice during the Uskok War in 1617–1618. The Diets of Bohemia and Hungary confirmed Ferdinand's position as Matthias' successor only after he had promised to respect the Estates' privileges in both realms. The different interpretation of the Letter of Majesty, which summarized the Bohemian Protestants' liberties, gave rise to an uprising, known as the Second Defenestration of Prague on 23 May 1618. The Bohemian rebels established a provisional government, invaded Upper Austria, and sought assistance from the Habsburgs' opponents. Matthias II died on 20 March 1619. Ferdinand was elected Holy Roman Emperor on 28 August 1619 (Frankfurt), two days before the Protestant Bohemian Estates deposed Ferdinand (as king of Bohemia). News of his deposition arrived in Frankfurt on the 28th, but Ferdinand did not leave the city until he had been crowned. The rebel Bohemians offered their crown to the Calvinist Frederick V of the Palatinate on 26 August 1619.

The Thirty Years' War began in 1618 as a result of the inadequacies of his predecessors, Rudolf II and Matthias. However, Ferdinand's acts against Protestantism caused the war to engulf the whole empire. As a zealous Catholic, Ferdinand wanted to restore the Catholic Church as the only religion in the Holy Roman Empire and to wipe out any form of religious dissent. The war left the empire devastated and its population did not recover until 1710.

== Childhood ==
Born in the castle in Graz on 9 July 1578, Ferdinand was the son of Charles II, Archduke of Austria, and Maria of Bavaria. Charles II, who was the youngest son of Ferdinand I, Holy Roman Emperor, had inherited the Inner Austrian provinces — Styria, Carinthia, Carniola, Gorizia, Fiume, Trieste and parts of Istria and Friuli — from his father in 1564. Being a daughter of Albert V, Duke of Bavaria, by Charles II's sister Anna, Maria of Bavaria was her husband's niece. Their marriage brought about a reconciliation between the two leading Catholic families of the Holy Roman Empire. They were devout Catholics, but Charles II had to grant concessions to his Lutheran subjects in 1572 and 1578 to secure the predominantly Protestant nobles and burghers' financial support for the establishment of a new defense system against the Ottoman Empire.

Ferdinand's education was managed primarily by his mother. He matriculated at the Jesuits' school in Graz at the age of 8. His separate household was set up three years later. His parents wanted to separate him from the Lutheran Styrian nobles and sent him to Ingolstadt to continue his studies at the Jesuits' college in Bavaria. Ferdinand chose Paul the Apostle's words — "To Those Who Fight Justly Goes the Crown" — as his personal motto before he left Graz in early 1590. His parents asked his maternal uncle, William V, Duke of Bavaria, to oversee his education.

== Reign ==
=== Inner Austria ===
==== First years ====
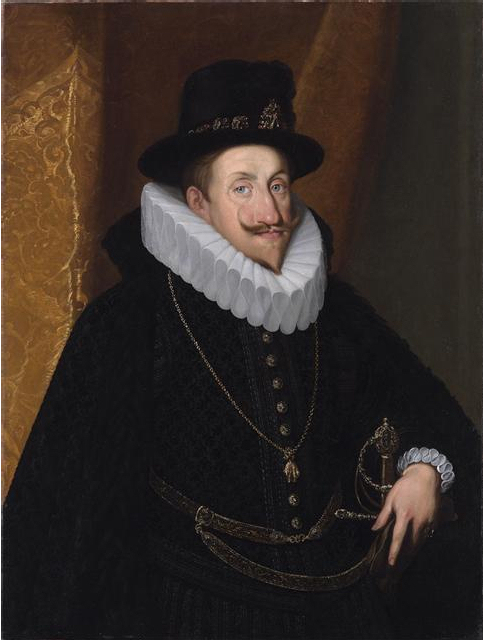
Portrait of Ferdinand in his twenties, c. 1598–1605

Charles II died unexpectedly on 10 July 1590, having named his wife, his brother Archduke Ferdinand II, Archduke of Austria, their nephew Emperor Rudolf II, and his brother-in-law Duke William V, Duke of Bavaria the guardians of Ferdinand. Maria and William V tried to secure the regency for her, but Rudolph II, who was the head of the Habsburg family, appointed his own brothers — first Ernest in 1592, and then in 1593, Maximilian III — to the post. The Estates of Inner Austria urged the emperor to procure Ferdinand's return from Bavaria; Maria resisted this, and Ferdinand continued his studies at the Jesuit university. Ferdinand and his maternal cousin, Maximilian I, Elector of Bavaria, were the only future European rulers to have pursued university studies in the late 16th century. He regularly attended classes, although his delicate health often forced him to stay in his chamber. His religiosity was reinforced during his studies: he did not miss the Masses on Sundays and feast days, and made pilgrimages to Bavarian shrines.

Ferdinand completed his studies on 21 December 1594; Rudolph II permitted him to return to Graz only two months later. Before leaving for his homeland, Ferdinand solemnly promised to support the university and the Jesuits. Maximilian III renounced the regency and the emperor made the 17-year-old Ferdinand his own regent. Ferdinand chose the Jesuit Bartholomew Viller as his confessor. A burgher from Graz who had converted to Catholicism, Hans Ulrich von Eggenberg, became one of his most trusted courtiers. The weak position of Catholicism in Graz astonished Ferdinand, especially when he realised that only his relatives and most trusted courtiers celebrated the Eucharist during the Easter Mass.

Ferdinand reached the age of majority in late 1596. He was first officially installed as ruler in Styria in December. He avoided discussion of religious affairs with the Estates, taking advantage of their fear of an Ottoman invasion and the peasant uprisings in Upper Austria. Early the following year, the representatives of the other Inner Austrian provinces swore fealty to him. He left unchanged the traditional system of government, appointing only Catholics to the highest offices. He and his mother then met with Rudolf II, Holy Roman Emperor in Prague, where Ferdinand informed the emperor of his plans to strengthen the position of Catholicism. The emperor's advisors acknowledged Ferdinand's right to regulate religious issues, yet requested he not provoke his Protestant subjects. Rudolph II gave Ferdinand responsibility for the defence of Croatia, Slavonia and the southeastern parts of Royal Hungary against the Ottomans. He visited Nagykanizsa, Cetin Castle and the nearby fortresses and ordered their repair.

Ferdinand made an unofficial journey to Italy before getting fully involved in state administration. He named his mother regent and left Graz on 22 April 1598. He met with Pope Clement VIII in Ferrara in early May, and briefly mentioned that he wanted to expel all Protestants from Inner Austria, which the Pope discouraged. Ferdinand continued his journey, visiting the Holy House in Loreto. At the shrine, he ceremoniously pledged that he would restore Catholicism, according to his first biography, written after his death by his confessor, Wilhelm Lamormaini.

==== Counter-Reformation ====
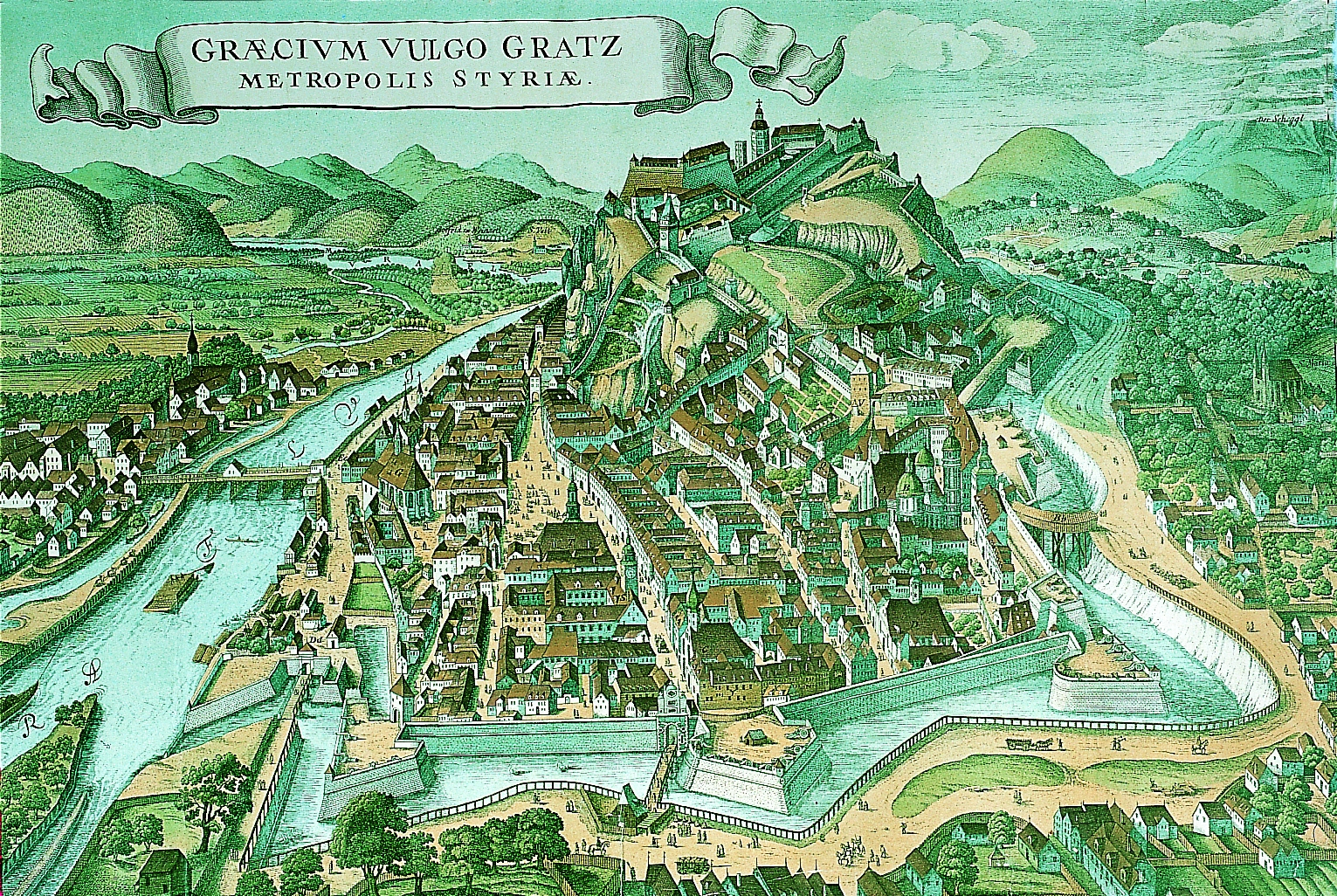
Graz in the mid-17th century

Ferdinand returned to Graz on 20 June 1598. Johannes Kepler, who had been staying in the town, noted that the Protestant burghers watched Ferdinand's return with some apprehension. He had already made unsuccessful attempts to appoint Catholic priests to churches in predominantly Lutheran towns prior to his Italian journey. A former Jesuit student, Lorenz Sonnabenter, whom Ferdinand had sent to a parish in Graz, made a formal complaint against the local Lutheran pastors on 22 August, accusing them of unlawfully interfering in his office. Ferdinand's mother and Jesuit confessor urged him to take vigorous measures. He ordered the expulsion of all Protestant pastors and teachers from Styria, Carinthia and Carniola on 13 September, emphasising that he was the "general overseer of all ecclesiastical foundations in his hereditary lands". When the Protestant nobles and burghers protested against his decree, he replied that the Estates had no jurisdiction in religious affairs. He summoned Italian and Spanish mercenaries to Graz. Due to his firm actions, no riots broke out when the leaders of the Protestant community left Graz on 29 September.

Ferdinand forbade the Estates of Styria, Carinthia and Carniola to hold a joint assembly. The Styrian nobles and burghers unsuccessfully sought assistance from Rudolph II and their Austrian peers against him. Although he issued new decrees to strengthen the position of the Catholic Church without seeking the Estates' consent, the Estates granted the subsidies that he had demanded from them. After the Styrian general assembly was dissolved, Ferdinand summarised his views of the Counter-Reformation in a letter to the delegates. He claimed that the unlawful prosecution of Catholics had forced him to adopt strict measures, adding that the Holy Spirit had inspired his acts. In October 1599, Ferdinand set up special commissions, consisting of a prelate and a high officer, to install Catholic priests in each town and village, and authorised them to apply military force if necessary. During the visit of the commissioners, local Protestants were to choose between conversion or exile, although in practice peasants were rarely allowed to leave. The commissioners also burnt prohibited books. Ferdinand did not force the Lutheran noblemen to convert to Catholicism, but forbade them from employing Protestant priests.

==== Brothers' Quarrel and Turkish War ====
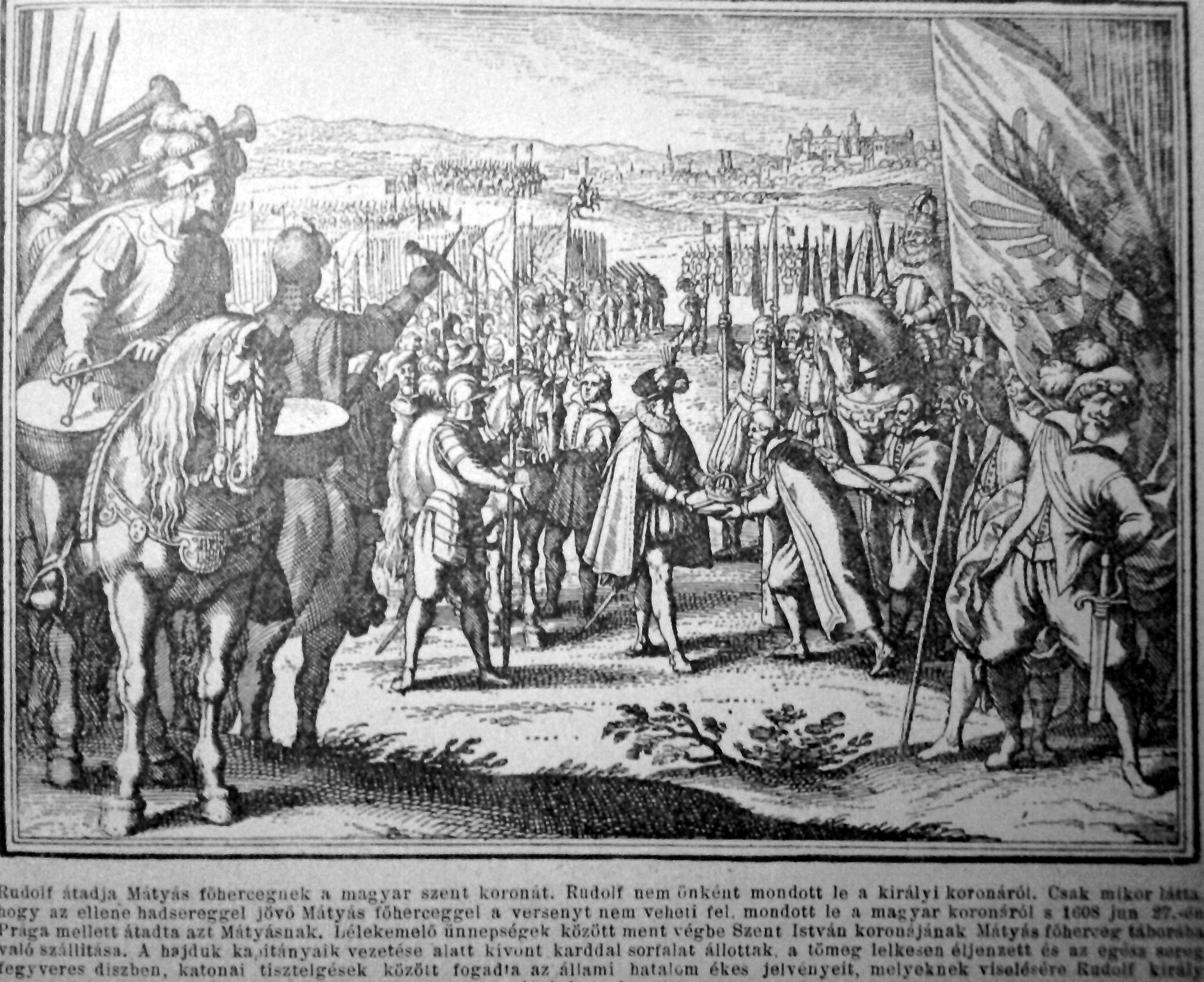
The meeting of Emperor Rudolf II, Holy Roman Emperor and his brother, Archduke Matthias near Prague in 1608

Ferdinand married his cousin, Maria Anna of Bavaria, in Graz on 23 April 1600. Their marriage improved the relationship between the Habsburgs and the Wittelsbachs, which had deteriorated because of the appointment of Ferdinand's brother Leopold V, Archduke of Austria to the Bishopric of Passau. Around the same time, the relationship between Rudolph II and his brother, Matthias, deteriorated. Fearing that the Protestant prince-electors could take advantage of his childless brother's death to elect a Protestant emperor, Matthias wanted to convince Rudolph II to name him as his successor. Matthias discussed the issue with his younger brother, Maximilian, and with Ferdinand at a secret meeting in Schottwien in October 1600. They agreed to jointly approach the emperor, but the superstitious and melancholic Rudolph flatly refused to talk about his succession.

The Uskoks made several attacks against the Venetian ships, claiming that the Venetians cooperated with the Ottomans. The Venetians urged Ferdinand to prevent further piratical actions. In 1600, he sent an envoy to the Uskoks, whom the Uskoks murdered. Ottoman raids against the borderlands continued and the expenses of the defence of Croatia, Slavonia and southwestern Hungary were almost exclusively financed from Inner Austria. Ferdinand could never properly manage financial affairs, and the most important fortresses were poorly supplied. The Ottomans occupied Nagykanizsa on 20 October 1600, which left the Styrian border almost defenseless against Ottoman raids. Ferdinand urged the Pope and Philip III of Spain to send reinforcements and funds to him. The Pope appointed his nephew, Gian Francesco Aldobrandini, as the commander of the papal troops. Ferdinand's counselors warned him against a counter-invasion before further reinforcements arrived, but Aldobrandini convinced him to lay siege to Nagykanizsa on 18 October 1601. After his troops were decimated by hunger and bad weather, Ferdinand was forced to lift the siege and return to Styria on 15 November.

The Ottomans failed to exploit this victory, as Rudolph II's troops managed to defeat them near Székesfehérvár. This victory restored Rudolph's self-confidence, and he decided to introduce severe Counter-Reformation measures in Silesia and Hungary, outraging his Protestant subjects. The Calvinist magnate István Bocskai rose up against Rudolph II, and most Hungarian noblemen joined him before the end of 1604. Taking advantage of his relatives' anxiety, Matthias persuaded Ferdinand, Maximilian and Ferdinand's brother, Maximilian Ernest, to start new negotiations concerning Rudolph's succession. At their meeting in Linz in April 1606, the four archdukes concluded that the emperor was incompetent and decided to replace him with Matthias in Bohemia, Hungary and Upper and Lower Austria. Ferdinand later claimed that he only signed the secret treaty because he feared that his relatives could otherwise accuse him of pursuing the throne for himself. Rudolph did not abdicate the throne, and announced that he was thinking of appointing Ferdinand's brother, Leopold, his successor. In fact, the emperor authorised Matthias to start negotiations with Bocskai. The resulting agreement was included in the Treaty of Vienna, which granted religious freedom to Hungarian Protestants and prescribed the election of a palatine (or royal deputy) in Hungary on 23 June 1606. The subsequent Peace of Zsitvatorok put an end to the war with the Ottoman Empire on 11 November 1606.

Rudolph II convoked the Imperial Diet to Regensburg and appointed Ferdinand as his deputy in November 1607. At the opening session of the Diet on 12 January 1608, Ferdinand demanded funds from the Imperial Estates on the emperor's behalf to finance 24,000 troops. The delegates of the Protestant princes stated that they would vote for the tax only if the Catholic Estates accepted their interpretation of the Religious Peace of Augsburg, especially their right to retain the lands they had confiscated from Catholic clerics in their realms. Ferdinand urged both parties to respect the Religious Peace, but without much success. He started negotiations with William V, Duke of Bavaria about the formation of an alliance of the Catholic princes, but his uncle wanted to establish it without the Habsburgs' participation. After the Diet was closed in early May, the Electoral Palatinate, Brandenburg, Würtemberg and other Protestant principalities formed an alliance, known as the Protestant Union, to defend their common interests.

Ferdinand's appointment as the emperor's deputy to the Diet implied that Rudolph regarded Ferdinand — the only Habsburg who had already fathered children — as his successor. Matthias made public his secret treaty with Ferdinand, and the emperor pardoned Ferdinand. Matthias concluded a formal alliance with the representatives of the Hungarian and Austrian Estates and led an army of 15,000 strong to Moravia. The envoys of the Holy See and Philip III of Spain mediated a compromise in June 1608. According to the Treaty of Lieben, Rudolph retained most Lands of the Bohemian Crown and the title of Holy Roman Emperor, but had to renounce Hungary, Lower and Upper Austria and Moravia in favor of Matthias. Both brothers were forced to confirm the privileges of the Estates in their realms, including religious freedom.

=== Matthias's successor ===
==== Negotiations and alliances ====
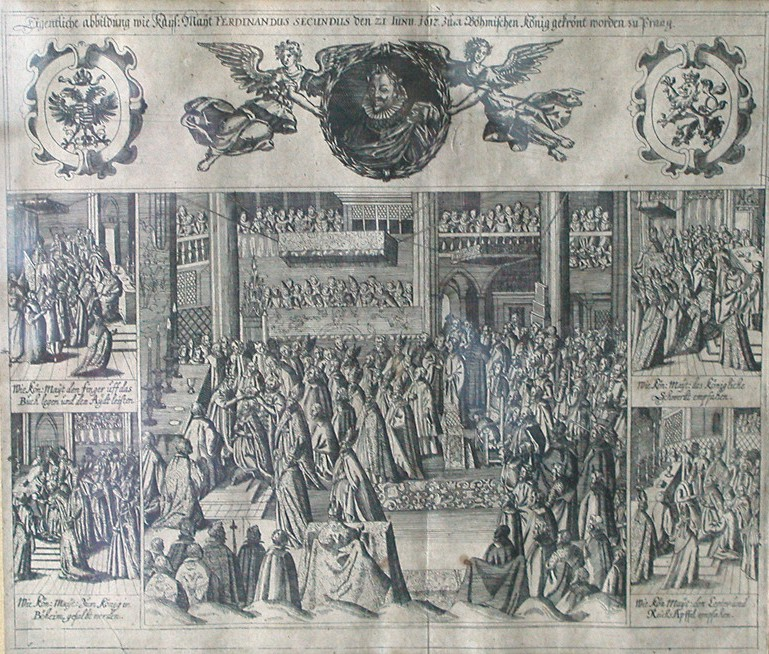
Coronation of Ferdinand II as king of Bohemia in 1617.

Ferdinand's mother died on 29 April 1608, while he was staying in Regensburg. With her death, as historian Robert L. Bireley noted, Ferdinand "lost the most important person in his life, the one who more than any other had formed his character and his outlook." He requested the scholar Caspar Schoppe, whom he had met at the Imperial Diet, to elaborate a detailed plan for an alliance of the Catholic monarchs. Schoppe argued that the alliance was to guarantee the Religious Peace, but he also demanded the restoration of Catholicism in all former ecclesiastic principalities and the return of the confiscated Church lands. Ferdinand embraced Schoppe's views and appointed him to start negotiations with Pope Paul V about a "just war" for the defence of the interests of Catholics, but the Pope avoided making a commitment, because he did not want to outrage Henry IV of France. Ferdinand also tried to strengthen his relationship with his Bavarian relatives, because Matthias' rebellion against Rudolph II and his concessions to the Protestants had shocked Ferdinand. However, William V and Maximilian I Joseph of Bavaria ignored him when they and the three ecclesiastical electors — the archbishops of Mainz, Trier and Cologne — established the Catholic League in February 1610. Only Philip III of Spain, who promised financial aid to the League, could persuade the Catholic princes to accept Ferdinand as a director and the vice-protector of the League in August.

Cooperating with Rudolph II's principal advisor, Melchior Klesl, Bishop of Vienna, Ferdinand persuaded the emperor to seek a reconciliation with Matthias. Ferdinand and other imperial princes came to Prague to meet with the emperor on 1 May 1610. He stayed neutral in the family feud, which enabled him to mediate between the two brothers. They reached a compromise, but Rudolph II refused to name Matthias as his successor. Instead, he adopted Ferdinand's younger brother, Leopold, who had hired 15,000 mercenaries at his request. Leopold invaded Bohemia in February 1611, but the troops of the Bohemian Estates defeated him. The Bohemian Estates dethroned Rudolph and elected Matthias king on 23 May 1611. Since Rudolph retained the title of emperor, his succession in the Holy Roman Empire remained uncertain. Matthias, Ferdinand and Maximilian III assembled at Vienna to discuss the issue with Philip III's envoy, Baltasar de Zúñiga, in December. They decided to support Matthias's election as King of the Romans (which could have secured his right to succeed Rudolph II), but the three ecclesiastical electors opposed the plan because of Matthias's concessions to the Protestants in Hungary, Austria and Bohemia.

Matthias was elected Holy Roman Emperor only months after Rudolph II died on 20 June 1612. Since Matthias and his two surviving brothers, Maximilian III, Archduke of Austria and Albert VII, Archduke of Austria were childless, his succession in Austria, Bohemia, Hungary and the Holy Roman Empire was uncertain. Matthias made Ferdinand the governor of Lower and Upper Austria and appointed him as his representative in Hungary, but Klesl became his most influential advisor. Klesl wanted to forge a new princely alliance in the Holy Roman Empire with the participation of both Catholic and Protestant princes. Ferdinand and Maximilian III regarded his plan dangerous and sent envoys to Rome to convince the Pope about the importance of a pure Catholic alliance. Although the Catholic League was renewed, it declared, in accordance with Klesl's proposal, the defence of the imperial constitution as its principal purpose instead of the protection of Catholicism. Philip III of Spain announced his claim to succeed Matthias in Bohemia and Hungary, emphasising that his mother, Anna of Austria, Queen of Spain, the sister of Matthias, had never renounced her right to the two realms. Matthias and Ferdinand discussed the issue with Zúñiga in Linz in June and July 1613, but they did not reach an agreement. Maximilian III and Albert VII who preferred Ferdinand to Philip III renounced their claims in favor of him in August 1614, but Melchior Klesl made several efforts to delay the decision.

==== Uskok War and royal elections ====
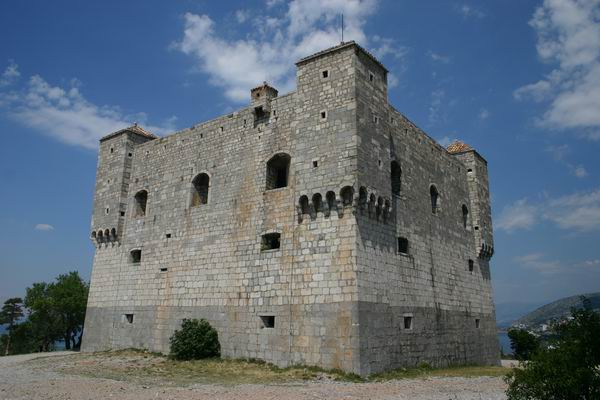
Nehaj Fortress held by the Uskoks. It is located on the Dalmatian coast near Senj.

Ferdinand sent troops against the Uskoks' principal center at Senj to put an end to their piratical raids in 1614. Dozens of Uskok commanders were captured and beheaded, but his action did not satisfy the Venetians, who invaded Istria and captured Habsburg territories in 1615. They besieged Gradisca from 12 February to 30 March, but they could not capture the fortress. Ferdinand sought assistance from Spain and the Venetians received support from the Dutch and English, but neither side could achieve a decisive victory in the Uskok War.

Matthias adopted Ferdinand as his son in 1615, but without proposing Ferdinand's election as king of the Romans, because he feared that Ferdinand would force him to abdicate. In early 1616, Ferdinand pledged that he would not interfere in state administration in Matthias's realms. Klesl, who regarded Ferdinand as the Jesuits' puppet, continued to oppose his appointment as Matthias's successor. On 31 October 1616, Ferdinand and Maximilian III agreed to achieve the removal of Klesl, but Ferdinand wanted to conclude an agreement with Philip III about Matthias's succession before making further steps. Philip's new envoy at Vienna, Íñigo Vélez de Guevara, Count consort of Oñate, and Ferdinand signed a secret treaty on 29 July 1617. Philip acknowledged Ferdinand's right to inherit Matthias's realms, but Ferdinand promised to cede territories in Alsace, along with Finale Ligure and the Principality of Piombino in Italy to Philip after he succeeded Matthias as Holy Roman Emperor. Philip also granted 1 million thalers to Ferdinand to finance the war against the Venetians. The Venetians again laid siege to Gradisca in March 1617. Ferdinand needed further funds, but the Estates did not vote for new taxes.

Matthias fell seriously ill in late April 1617. Ignoring Klesl's advice, he convoked the Diet of Bohemia to secure Ferdinand's succession. He announced that his two brothers had abdicated in favor of Ferdinand, but the majority of the Bohemian delegates denied the Habsburgs' hereditary right to Bohemia. After some negotiations, all delegates but two noblemen and two burghers agreed to "accept" Ferdinand as king on 6 June. Ferdinand promised to respect the Letter of Majesty — a royal diploma that guaranteed religious freedom in the Lands of the Bohemian Crown — only after consulting with the local Jesuits. He was crowned king in the St. Vitus Cathedral on 29 June. Ten regents (seven Catholics and three Protestants) were appointed and they established a censor office in Prague.

Ferdinand and Matthias met with the Lutheran John George I, Elector of Saxony in Dresden, who promised to support Ferdinand at the imperial elections. John George also agreed to convince the two other Protestant electors, Frederick V of the Palatinate and John Sigismund, Elector of Brandenburg, to vote for Ferdinand. Ferdinand hired new troops against the Venetians and volunteers also joined his army. The Catholic Bohemian nobleman, Albrecht von Wallenstein, recruited 260 soldiers at his own expense. The Venetians abandoned the siege of Gradisca on 22 September 1617, but peace was restored only in early 1618, after Ferdinand agreed to resettle the Uskoks from the coastline and ordered the destruction of their ships. The Venetians abandoned the territories that they had occupied in Istria and a permanent Austrian garrison was placed at Senj.

Matthias convoked the Diet of Hungary to Pressburg (now Bratislava in Slovakia) in early 1618. After the Hungarian delegates achieved the appointment of a new palatine (or royal lieutenant) and the confirmation of the Estates' privileges, they proclaimed Ferdinand king on 16 May 1618. He appointed the Catholic magnate, Zsigmond Forgách, as the new palatine.

=== Thirty Years' War ===
==== Bohemian revolt ====
The Holy Roman Empire on the eve of the war's outbreak in 1618. Habsburg-controlled domains: Austrian line Spanish line

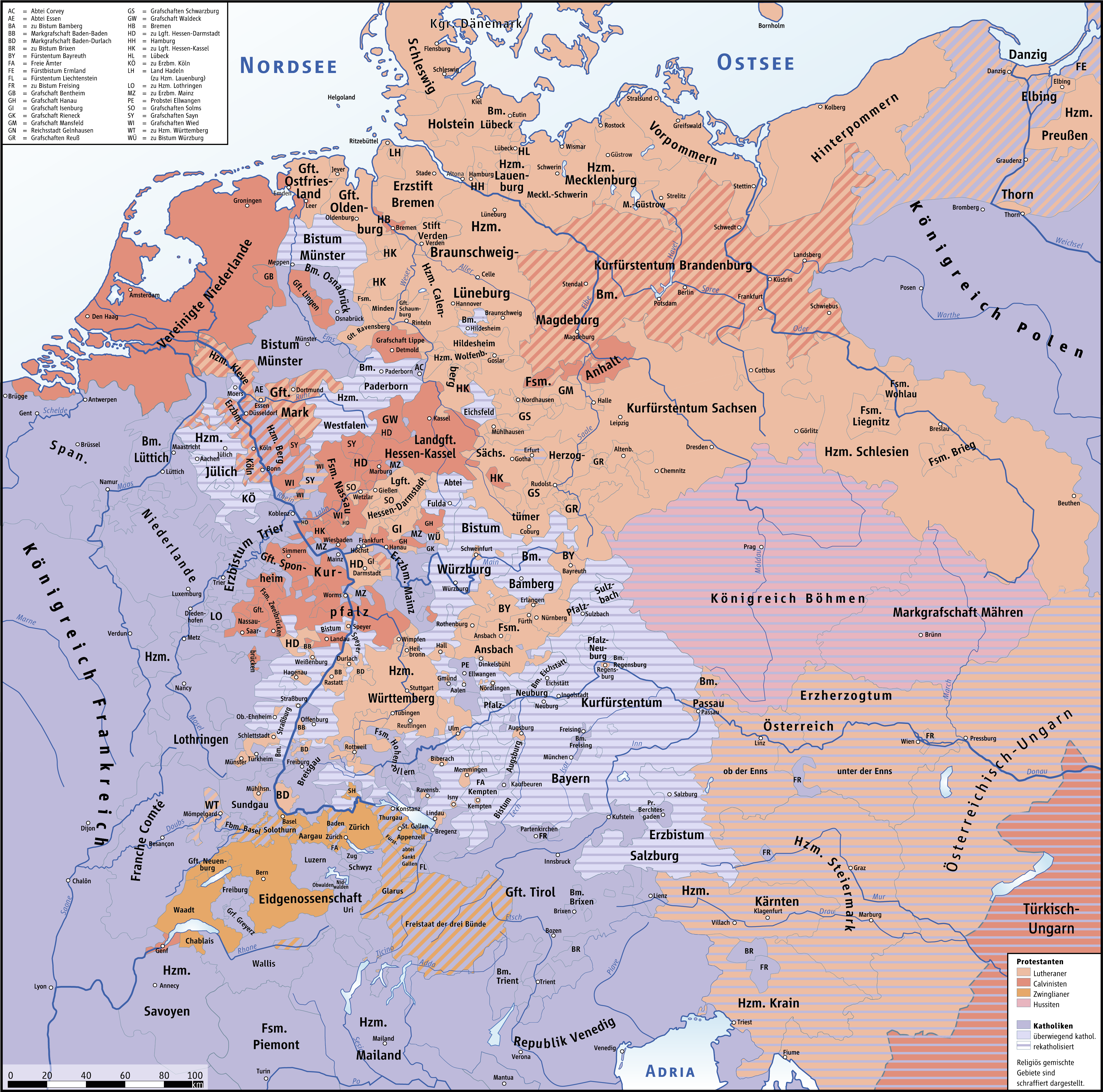
Religious situation in the Holy Roman Empire at the outbreak of the Thirty Years' War in 1618

The Battle of White Mountain (1620) in Bohemia was one of the decisive battles of the Thirty Years' War that ultimately led to the forced conversion of the Bohemian population back to Roman Catholicism.

The application of the Letter of Majesty was controversial in Bohemia. The Protestants argued that it allowed them to build churches on Catholic prelates' lands, but the Catholics did not accept their interpretation. Royal officials arrested Protestant burghers who wanted to build a church in Broumov and destroyed a newly built church in Hrob. The Protestants principally blamed two of the four Catholic royal governors, Jaroslav Bořita of Martinice and Vilém Slavata of Chlum, for the violent acts. On 23 May 1618, Jindřich Matyáš Thurn — one of the two Czech magnates who had not accepted Ferdinand's succession — led a group of armed noblemen to the Prague Castle. They captured the two governors and one of their secretaries and threw them out of the window. The Third Defenestration of Prague was the start of a new uprising. Two days later, the Protestant Estates elected directors to form a provisional government and started to raise an army.

Ferdinand was staying in Pressburg when he was informed of the Bohemian events on 27 May 1618. He urged Matthias to send an envoy to Prague, but Matthias' envoy could not reach a compromise. Ferdinand was crowned king of Hungary on 1 July, and he returned to Vienna two weeks later. Ferdinand and Maximilian III decided to get rid of Klesl, although the cardinal supported their demand for a more determined policy against the Bohemian rebels. After a meeting with Klesl at his home, they invited him to the Hofburg, but Ferdinand ordered his arrest at the entrance of the palace on 20 July. Ferdinand was automatically excommunicated for the imprisonment of a cardinal, but Pope Paul V absolved him before the end of the year. Ferdinand started negotiations with the rebels with the mediation of John George I, Elector of Saxony. He demanded the dissolution of the provisional government and the rebels' army. Instead of obeying his orders, the rebels concluded an alliance with the Estates of Silesia, Upper and Lower Lusatia, and Upper Austria. Charles Emmanuel I hired Ernst von Mansfeld to assist the Bohemians. Mansfeld and his mercenaries captured Plzeň, which was an important center of the Bohemian Catholics, and the rebels made raids into Lower Austria. From September 1618, Pope Paul V paid a monthly subsidy to Ferdinand to contribute to the costs of the war and Philip III of Spain also promised support to him.

Emperor Matthias died on 20 March 1619. Maximilian I Joseph of Bavaria encouraged Ferdinand to adopt an aggressive policy against the Bohemian rebels, but Ferdinand again confirmed the Letter of Majesty and urged the Bohemians to send delegates to Vienna. The directors ignored Ferdinand's acts and made further preparations for an armed conflict. Albrecht von Wallenstein stormed into Olomouc and seized 96,000 thalers from the Moravian treasury on 30 April. He gave the booty to Ferdinand, but the king returned it to the Moravian Estates. The Protestant Estates of Upper Austria demanded the confirmation of their religious and political liberties before recognising Ferdinand as Matthias' successor. Thurn and his 15,000 troops laid siege to Vienna on 5 June. Since only 300 soldiers were staying in the town, Ferdinand sent envoys to his commander at Krems, Henri Duval, Count of Dampierre and entered into negotiations with the Upper Austrian Protestants about their demands. Dampierre and his troops reached Vienna by boat and forced the Protestant delegates to flee from the Hofburg. After Ferdinand's general, Charles Bonaventure de Longueval, 2nd Count of Bucquoy, defeated the Bohemian rebels in the Battle of Sablat, Thurn lifted the siege on 12 June 1619.

Johann Schweikhard von Kronberg, Archbishop of Mainz, convoked the electors' meeting to Frankfurt. Ferdinand avoided the rebellious Upper Austria and approached the assembly through Salzburg and Munich. The Bohemians sent envoys to the conference and denied Ferdinand's right to vote as their king, but the electors ignored their demand. The Estates of all Lands of the Bohemian Crown formed a confederation on 31 July. They deposed Ferdinand on 22 August, and four days later, they offered the crown to Frederick V of the Palatinate. Frederick had tried to convince the electors to elect Maximilian I of Bavaria as the new Holy Roman Emperor. Maximilian did not accept the candidacy and Ferdinand was unanimously elected as emperor on 28 August. The news about Ferdinand's deposition in Bohemia reached Frankfurt on the same day, but he did not leave the town before being crowned on 9 September. Gabriel Bethlen, Prince of Transylvania, made an alliance with the Bohemians and invaded Upper Hungary (mainly present-day Slovakia) in September. After learning of Bethlen's success, Frederick V accepted the Bohemian crown on 28 September.

Ferdinand concluded a treaty with Maximilian I in Munich on 8 October 1619. Maximilian became the head of a renewed Catholic League and Ferdinand promised to compensate him for the costs of the war. He was still in Munich when Bethlen and Thurn united their forces and laid siege to Vienna in November. Ferdinand sought assistance from his staunchly Catholic brother-in-law, Sigismund III of Poland. Sigismund did not intervene; however, he did hire mercenaries from the Cossack lands, which invaded Upper Hungary and forced Bethlen to hurry back to Transylvania in late January 1620. Ferdinand and Bethlen concluded a 9-month truce, which temporarily acknowledged Bethlen's conquests in Hungary. Abandoned by Bethlen, Thurn was forced to lift the siege. Ferdinand ordered Frederick to abandon Bohemia before 1 July, threatening him with an imperial ban. John George I, Elector of Saxony promised support against the Bohemian rebels in exchange for Lusatia, but Bethlen made a new alliance with the Bohemian Confederation and they sent envoys to Constantinople to seek Sultan Osman II's assistance.

Ferdinand continued the negotiations with the Estates of Lower and Upper Austria about his recognition as Matthias' successor in both provinces. After his new confessor, the Jesuit Martin Becanus, assured him that he could grant concessions to the Protestants to secure their loyalty, Ferdinand confirmed the Lutherans' right to practise their religion in Lower Austria, save the towns on 8 July 1620. Five days later, the vast majority of the noblemen swore fealty to him. Before long, Johann Tserclaes, Count of Tilly, who was the commander of the army of the Catholic League, occupied Upper Austria, Bucquoy defeated the last rebels in Lower Austria and John George of Saxony invaded Lusatia. Maximilian I retained Upper Austria as a security for Ferdinand's debts and the local Estates swore fealty to him on 20 August. The Diet of Hungary dethroned Ferdinand and elected Bethlen king on 23 August. Louis XIII's envoy, Charles de Valois, Duke of Angoulême, tried to mediate a compromise between Ferdinand and his opponents, but Ferdinand was determined to force his rebellious subjects into obedience. The united troops of Maximilian I of Bavaria, Tilly and Bucquoy invaded Bohemia and inflicted a decisive defeat on the Bohemians and their allies in the Battle of White Mountain on 8 November 1620.

==== Consolidation ====
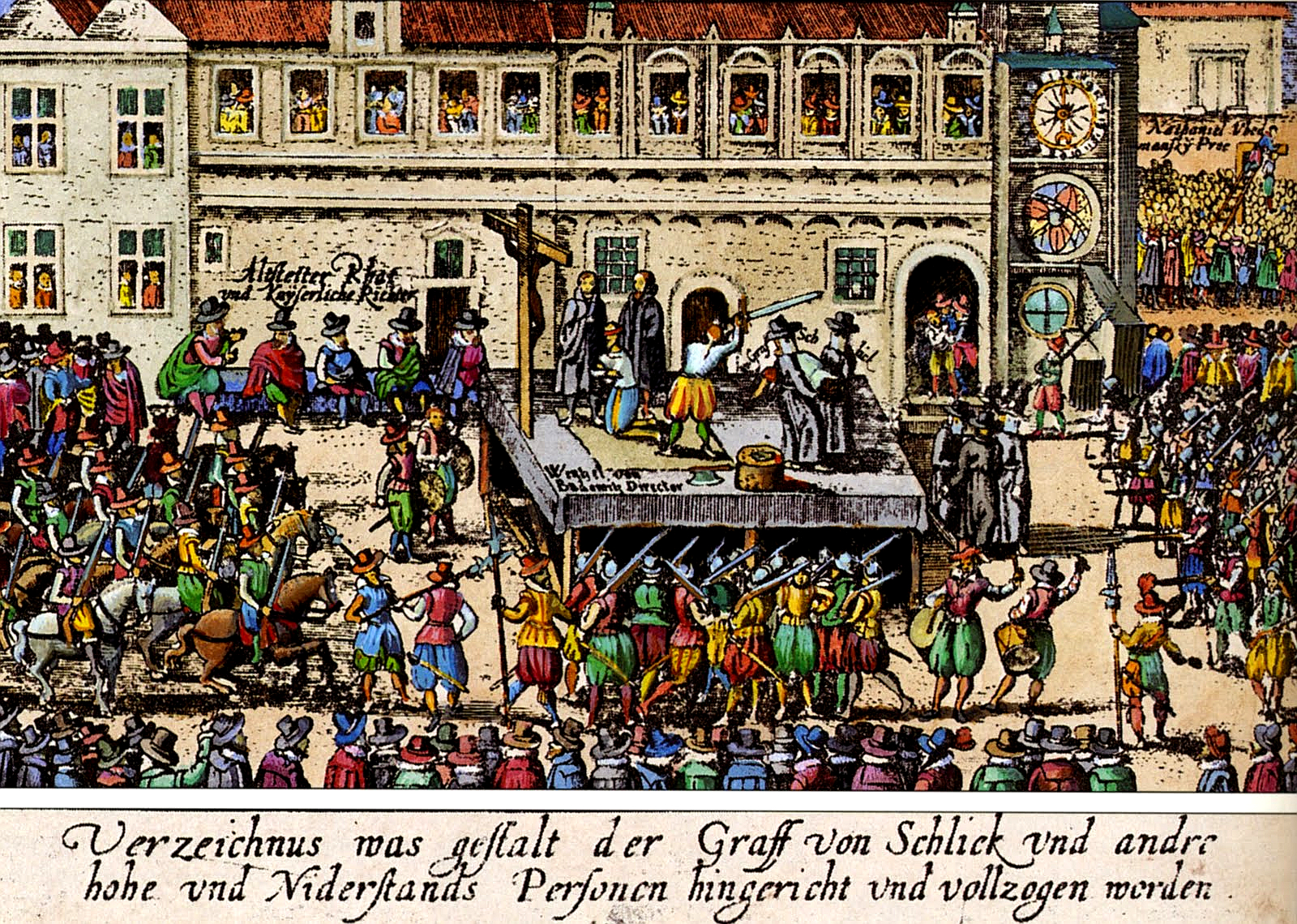
The execution of 27 Bohemian noblemen and burghers in Prague

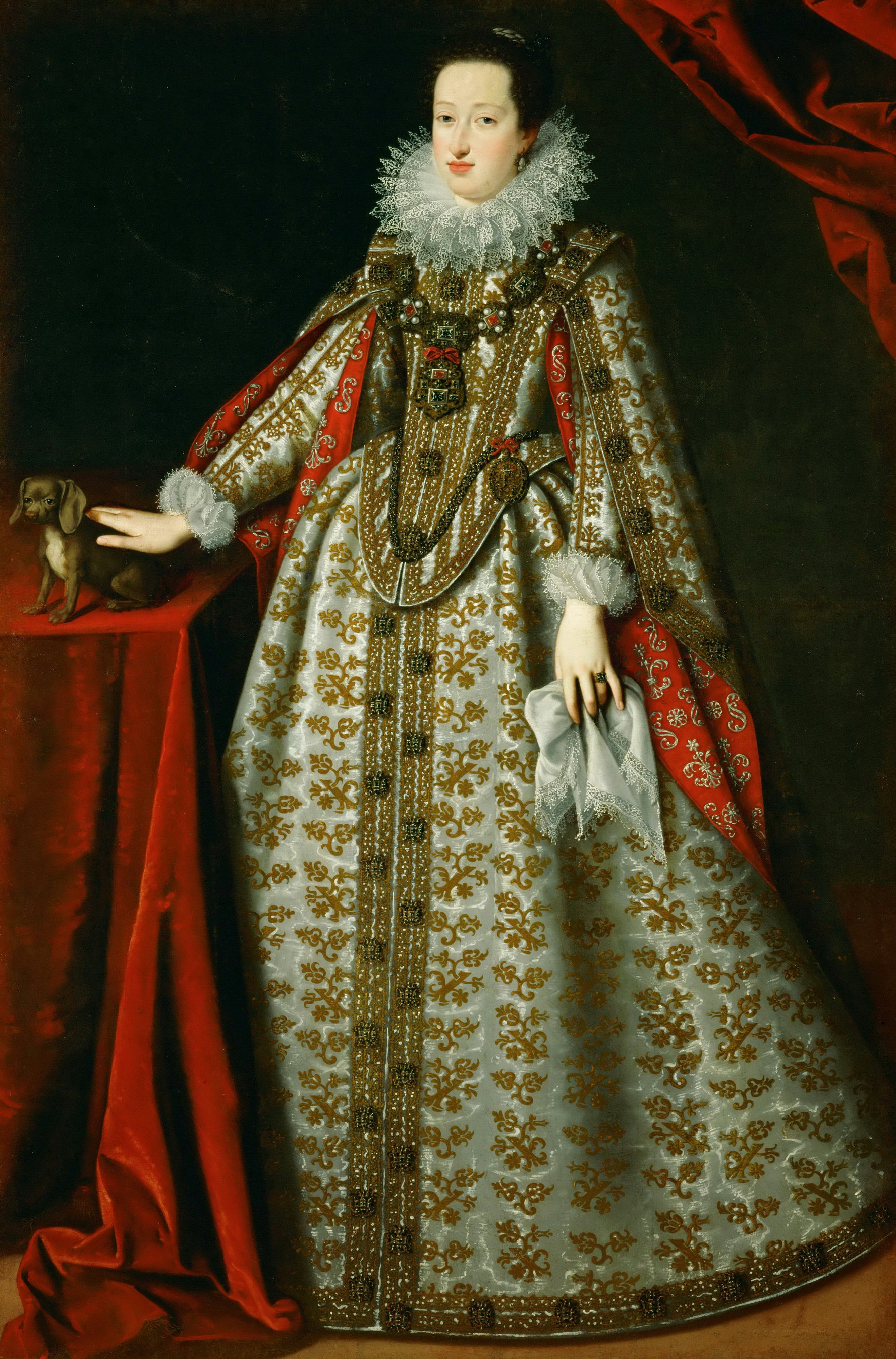
Eleonora Gonzaga in her wedding dress, by Justus Sustermans, 1621/1622. Kunsthistorisches Museum, Vienna.

Maximilian I of Bavaria urged Ferdinand to adopt strict measures against the Bohemians and their allies, and Ferdinand declared Frederick V an outlaw on 29 January 1621. Ferdinand charged Karl I, Prince of Liechtenstein and Cardinal Franz von Dietrichstein with the government of Bohemia and Moravia, respectively, and ordered the establishment of special courts of justice to hear the rebels' trials. The new tribunals sentenced most leaders of the rebellion to death, and 27 of them were executed in the Old Town Square in Prague on 21 June. The estates of more than 450 nobles and burghers were fully or partially confiscated. Ferdinand demanded further trials, but Karl I convinced him to grant a general pardon, because Mansfeld's troops had not been expelled from western Bohemia. Bethlen also wanted to continue the war against Ferdinand, but the Ottomans did not support him. After lengthy negotiations, Bethlen renounced the title of king of Hungary, after Ferdinand ceded him seven Hungarian counties and two Silesian duchies in the Peace of Nikolsburg on 31 December 1621. By that time, Ferdinand had banned all Protestant pastors from Prague, ignoring John George I, Elector of Saxony's protests.

Ferdinand could not pay off his mercenaries' salaries. Karl I, Eggenberg, Albrecht von Wallenstein and other noblemen established a consortium that also included the Jewish banker, Jacob Bassevi, and Wallenstein's financial manager, Hans de Witte. They persuaded Ferdinand to lease all Bohemian, Moravian and Lower Austrian mints to them for one year in return for 6 million gulden on 18 January 1622. The consortium minted debased silver coins, issuing almost 30 million gulden. They used the bad money to purchase silver and the rebels' confiscated property and also to pay off the lease. The liberal issue of the new currency caused "the Western world's first financial crisis", featured by inflation, famine and other symptoms of economic and social disruption. Dietrichstein and the Jesuits urged Ferdinand to intervene, and he dissolved the consortium in early 1623.

Ferdinand met his second wife, the 23-year-old Eleonora Gonzaga, in Innsbruck on 1 February 1622. She was crowned as queen of Hungary in Sopron, where the first Italian opera was performed in the Habsburgs' realms during the festivities that followed the coronation. Ferdinand had convoked the Diet of Hungary to Sopron to assure the Hungarian Estates that he would respect their privileges. The Diet elected a Lutheran aristocrat, Count Szaniszló Thurzó, as the new palatine.

The united Imperial and Spanish armies inflicted decisive defeats on the Protestant troops in the Holy Roman Empire in May and June 1622. Tilly conquered the capital of the Palatinate, Heidelberg, on 19 September. Ferdinand convoked the German princes to a conference in Regensburg, primarily to talk about the future of the Palatinate. He reached the town on 24 November, but most Protestant princes sent delegates to the convention. He had secretly promised the transfer of Frederick V's title of elector to Maximilian I and his heirs, but most of his allies did not support the plan. They only agreed to bestow the title on Maximilian personally. Ferdinand had to yield, but assured Maximilian that he had not abandoned their original plan. He invested Maximilian with the electoral title on 25 February 1623, but the envoys of the electors of Brandenburg and Saxony and the Spanish ambassador were absent from the ceremony.

Ferdinand decided to unite the Habsburgs' hereditary lands — Inner Austria, Upper and Lower Austria and Tyrol — into a new kingdom. He informed his brothers, Leopold and Charles, about his plan in a letter on 29 April 1623, but they rejected it. Leopold wanted to establish his own principality. He renounced the bishoprics of Passau and Strasbourg in favor of Ferdinand's younger son, Leopold Wilhelm, and retained Further Austria and Tyrol (that he had administered since 1619).

Deprived of the Palatinate, Frederick V had made a new alliance with the Dutch Republic. Bethlen used Ferdinand's refusal to give one of his daughters to him in marriage as a pretext to join the new coalition. Christian of Brunswick was dispatched to invade Bohemia from the north, while Bethlen attacked from the east, but Johann Tserclaes, Count of Tilly routed Brunswick in the Battle of Stadtlohn on 6 August 1623. The Ottomans denied support to Bethlen and he was forced to sign a new peace treaty in Vienna in May 1624. The treaty confirmed the provisions of the previous Peace of Nikolsburg.

==== Restoration ====
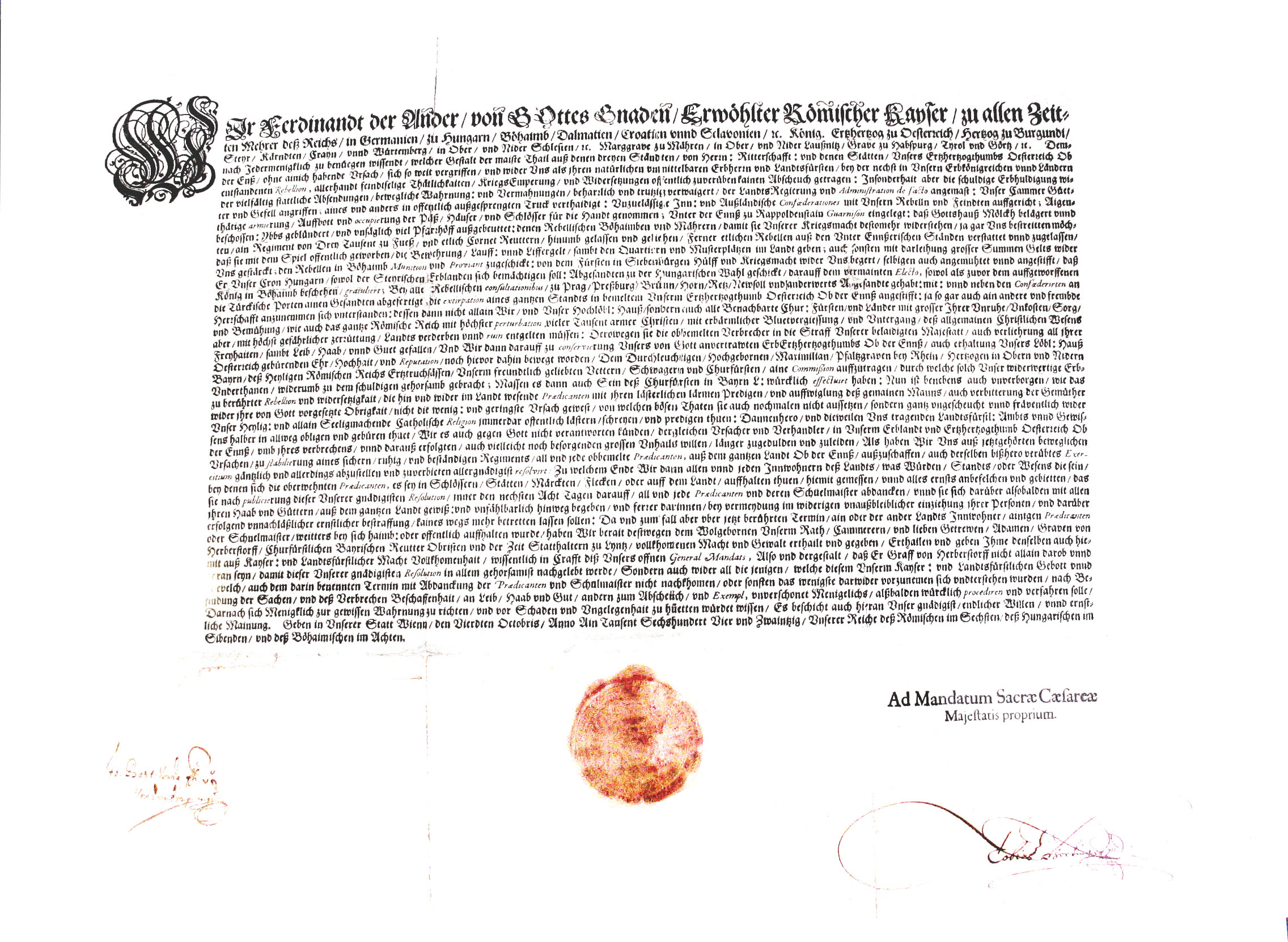
Ferdinand's Reformationspatent ordered every Protestant preacher and teacher in Upper Austria to be inducted into a special registry in 1624.

Martin Becanus, who died in late 1623, was succeeded by Wilhelm Lamormaini as Ferdinand's confessor. Lamormaini awakened Ferdinand's determination to adopt strict measures against the Protestants. At his initiative, Ferdinand decided to unite the medical and law faculties of the Charles University in Prague with the theological and philosophical faculties of the Jesuits' local college to strengthen the Jesuits' control of higher education. The new archbishop of Prague, Ernst Adalbert of Harrach did not renounce the control of the university and also wanted to prevent the Jesuits from seizing the estates of Charles University. Valerianus Magnus, the head of the Capuchins in Bohemia, and the Holy See supported Harrach, but Ferdinand did not relent.

Ferdinand ceremoniously renewed his oath about the restoration of Catholicism in his realms on 25 March 1624. First, he banned Protestant ceremonies in Bohemia proper and Moravia, even prohibiting the noblemen from holding Protestant pastors on 18 May. Maximilian I of Bavaria, who still held Upper Austria in pledge, proposed a cautious approach in the province, but Ferdinand ordered the expulsion of all Protestant pastors and teachers on 4 October. A year later, he prescribed that all inhabitants were to convert to Catholicism in Upper Austria by the following Easter, allowing only noblemen and burghers to choose to leave the province. The Upper Austrian peasants rose in a rebellion and took control of the territories to the north of the Danube in May–June 1626. They sent delegates to Ferdinand in Vienna, but he did not give them an audience. Instead, he sent troops from Lower Austria to assist the Bavarian army in the crushing of the rebellion, which was accomplished by the end of November. Tens of thousands of Protestants left Upper Austria during the following years.

Ferdinand also took advantage of his peace with Bethlen to strengthen his position in Hungary. The Diet of Hungary confirmed the right of his son, Ferdinand III, to succeed him in October 1625. Ferdinand also achieved the election of a Catholic magnate, Nikolaus, Count Esterházy, as the new palatine with the support of the Archbishop of Esztergom, Cardinal Péter Pázmány.

==== Conclusion ====
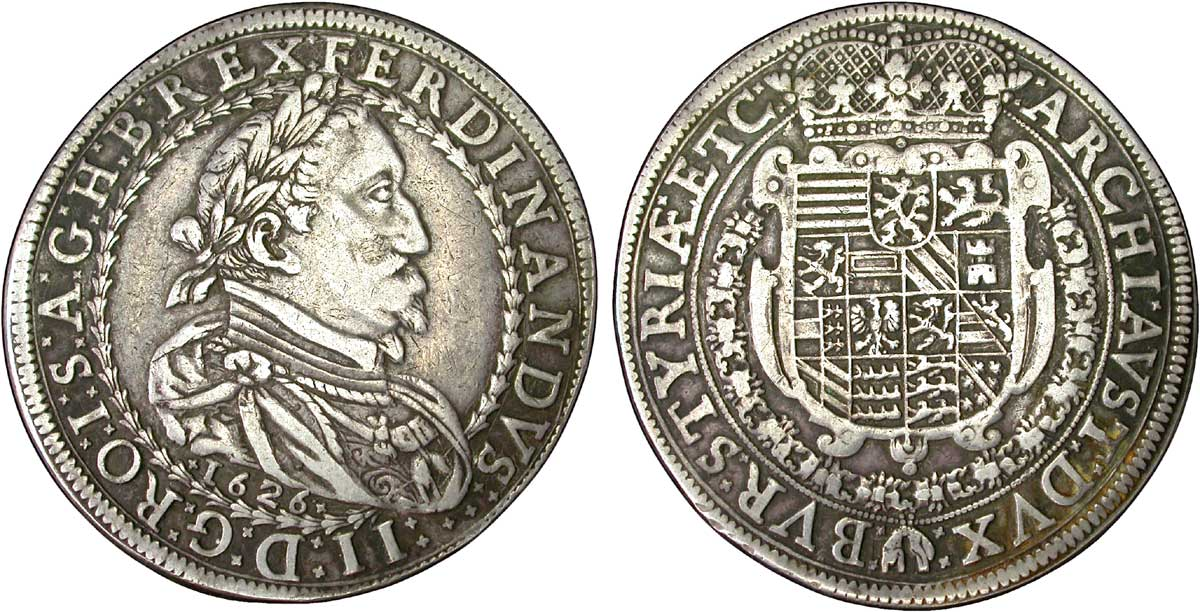
Ferdinand II, 1626

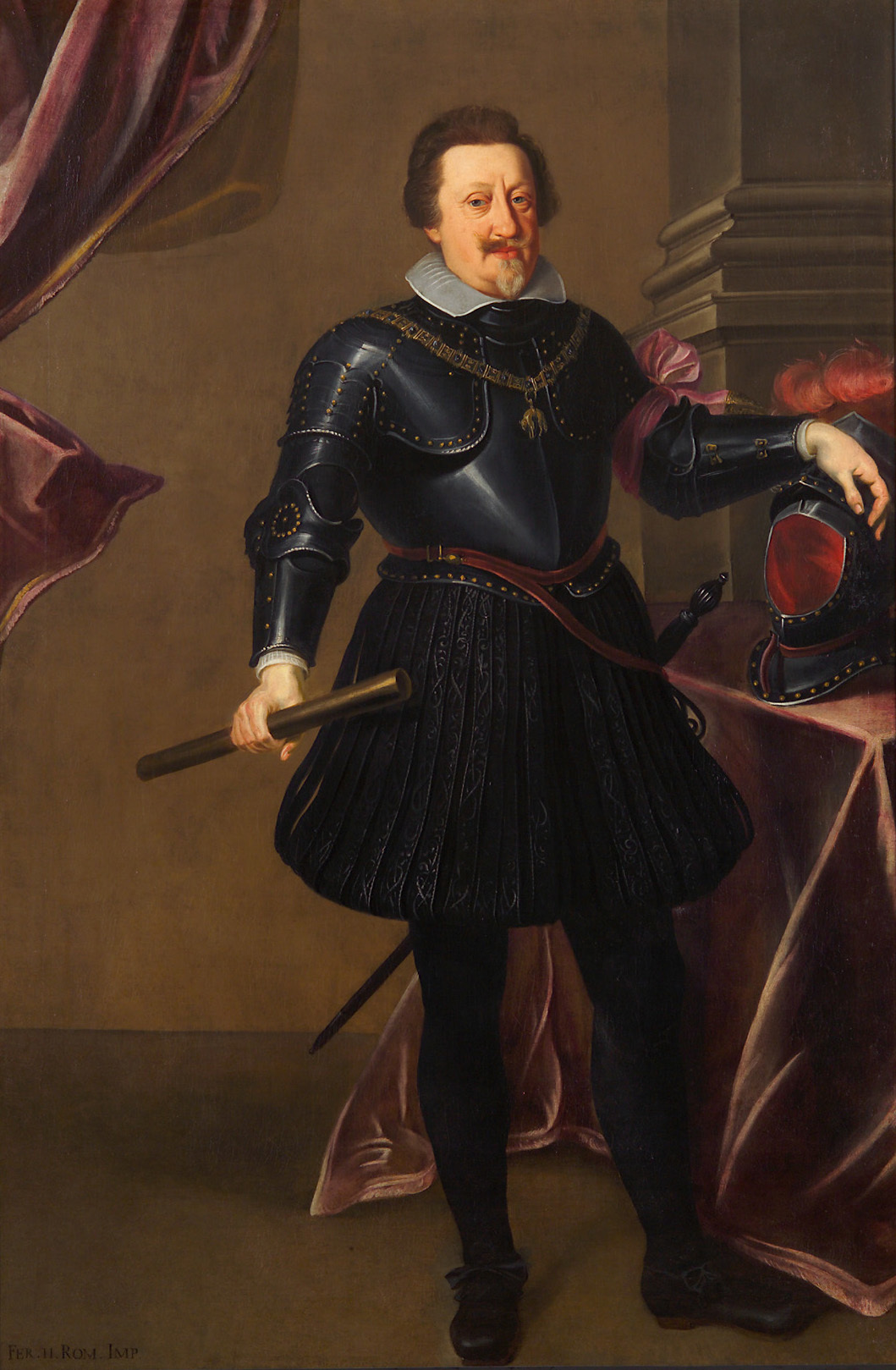
Ferdinand II, 1635 (two years before his death)

The chief minister of Louis XIII of France, Cardinal Richelieu, started to forge an alliance against the Habsburgs in 1624. French troops were garrisoned along the French frontiers and Richelieu sent envoys to the wealthy and ambitious Christian IV of Denmark and other Protestant rulers to convince them to form a new league. Christian IV raised new troops and stationed them in his Duchy of Holstein (in the Lower Saxon Circle of the Holy Roman Empire) and persuaded the other Lower Saxon rulers to make him the commander of their united armies in early 1625. Initially, Ferdinand wanted to avoid the renewal of armed conflicts, but Maximilian I Joseph of Bavaria urged him to gather an army against the new Protestant alliance. Albrecht von Wallenstein, who had accumulated immeasurable wealth in Bohemia, offered to hire mercenaries for him, but Ferdinand still hesitated. He authorised Maximilian to invade the Lower Saxon Circle if it were necessary to stop a Danish attack only in July. In the same month, Maximilian ordered Johann Tserclaes, Count of Tilly to move his troops into Lower Saxony, and Wallenstein invaded the Archbishopric of Magdeburg and the Bishopric of Halberstadt, but a fierce rivalry between the two commanders prevented them from continuing the military campaign.

The electors of Mainz and Saxony demanded that Ferdinand should convoke the electors to a new convention to discuss the status of the Palatinate, but Ferdinand adopted a delaying tactic. In a letter, he informed Maximilian of Bavaria about his plan to grant a pardon to Frederick V in exchange for Frederick's public submission and an indemnification for the costs of the war, but he also emphasised that he did not want to deprive Maximilian of the electoral title. The English, Dutch and Danish envoys concluded an alliance against the Catholic League in The Hague on 9 December 1625. Bethlen promised to launch a new military campaign against Royal Hungary and Richelieu agreed to send a subsidy to him. Taking advantage of the peasant revolt in Upper Austria, Christian IV departed from his headquarters in Wolfenbüttel, but Tilly routed his troops in the Battle of Lutter on 26 August 1626. Mansfeld had invaded Silesia and reached Upper Hungary, but Bethlen made a new peace with Ferdinand on 20 December 1626, because he could not wage war alone against the emperor.

Ferdinand deprived the dukes of Mecklenburg of their duchies for their support of Christian IV in February 1627. In the same month, Wallenstein occupied Mecklenburg, Pomerania and Holstein, and invaded Denmark.

His devout Catholicism and negative view of Protestantism caused immediate turmoil in his non-Catholic subjects, especially in Bohemia. He did not wish to uphold the religious liberties granted by the Letter of Majesty signed by the previous emperor, Rudolf II, Holy Roman Emperor, which had guaranteed freedom of religion to the nobles and cities. Additionally, Ferdinand, as an absolutist monarch, infringed several historical privileges of the nobles. Given the great number of Protestants among the ordinary population in the kingdom, and some of the nobles, the king's unpopularity soon caused the Bohemian Revolt. The Third Defenestration of Prague of 22 May 1618 is considered the first step of the Thirty Years' War.

In the following events, he remained a staunch backer of the Anti-Protestant Counter Reformation efforts as one of the heads of the German Catholic League. Ferdinand succeeded Matthias as Holy Roman Emperor in 1619. Supported by the Catholic League and the Kings of Spain and the Polish–Lithuanian Commonwealth, Ferdinand decided to reclaim his possession in Bohemia and to quash the rebels. On 8 November 1620, his troops, led by the Flemish general Johann Tserclaes, Count of Tilly, smashed the rebels of Frederick V of the Palatinate, who had been elected as rival King in 1619. After Frederick's flight to the Netherlands, Ferdinand ordered a massive effort to bring about re-conversion to Catholicism in Bohemia and Austria, causing Protestantism there to nearly disappear in the following decades, and reducing the Diet's power.

In 1625, despite the subsidies received from Spain and the Pope, Ferdinand was in a bad financial situation. In order to muster an imperial army to continue the war, he applied to Albrecht von Wallenstein, one of the richest men in Bohemia: the latter accepted on condition that he could keep total control over the direction of the war, as well as over the booty taken during the operations. Wallenstein was able to recruit some 30,000 men (later expanded up to 100,000), with whom he was able to defeat the Protestants in Silesia, Anhalt and Denmark. In the wake of these Catholic military successes, in 1629 Ferdinand issued the Edict of Restitution, by which all the lands stripped from Catholics after the Peace of Passau of 1552 would be returned.

His military success caused the tottering Protestants to call in Gustavus Adolphus, King of Sweden. Soon, some of Ferdinand's allies began to complain about the excessive power exercised by Wallenstein, as well as the ruthless methods he used to finance his vast army. Ferdinand replied by firing the Bohemian general in 1630. The leadership of the war thenceforth passed to Tilly, who was, however, unable to stop the Swedish march from northern Germany towards Austria. Some historians directly blame Ferdinand for the large civilian loss of life in the Sack of Magdeburg in 1631: he had instructed Tilly to enforce the edict of Restitution upon the Electorate of Saxony, his orders causing the Belgian general to move the Catholic armies east, ultimately to Leipzig, where they suffered their first substantial defeat at the hands of Adolphus' Swedes in the First Battle of Breitenfeld (1631).

Tilly died in battle in 1632. Wallenstein was recalled, being able to muster an army in only a week, and immediately staked a tactical, if not strategic, victory at the September Battle of Fürth, quickly followed by his forces expelling the Swedes from Bohemia. In November 1632, however, the Catholics were defeated in the Battle of Lützen (1632), while Gustavus Adolphus was himself killed.

A period of minor operations followed. Perhaps because of Wallenstein's ambiguous conduct, he was assassinated in 1634. Despite Wallenstein's fall, the imperial forces recaptured Regensburg and were victorious in the Battle of Nördlingen (1634). The Swedish army was substantially weakened, and the fear that the power of the Habsburgs would become overwhelming caused France, led by Louis XIII and Cardinal Richelieu, to enter the war on the Protestant side. (Louis's father Henri IV had once been a Huguenot leader.) In 1635, Ferdinand signed his last important act, the Peace of Prague (1635), yet this did not end the war.

Ferdinand died in 1637, leaving to his son Ferdinand III, Holy Roman Emperor an empire still engulfed in a war and whose fortunes seemed to be increasingly chaotic. Ferdinand II was buried in his Mausoleum in Graz. His heart was interred in the Herzgruft (heart crypt) of the Augustinian Church, Vienna.

== Marriages and issue ==
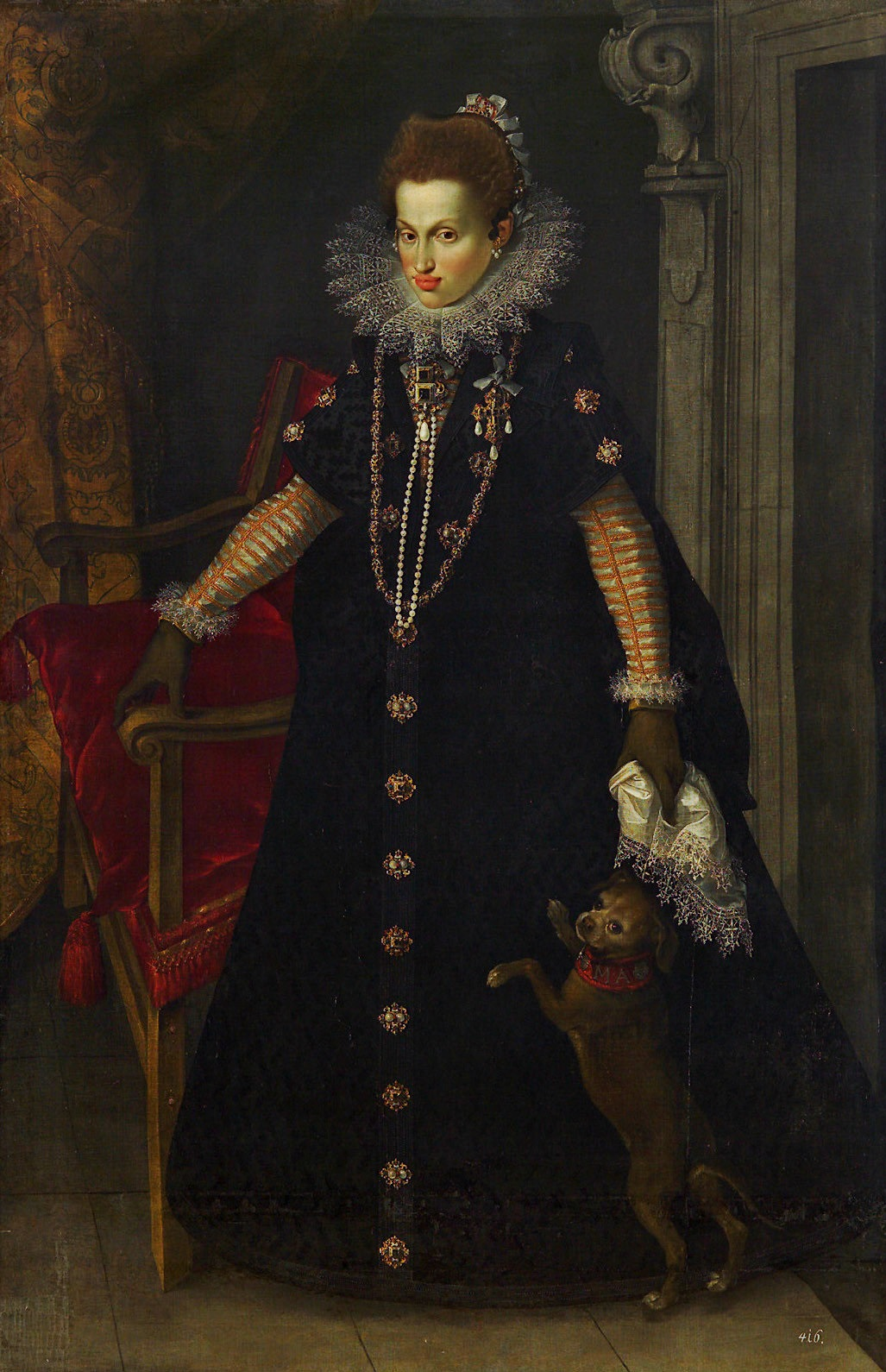
Maria Anna of Bavaria

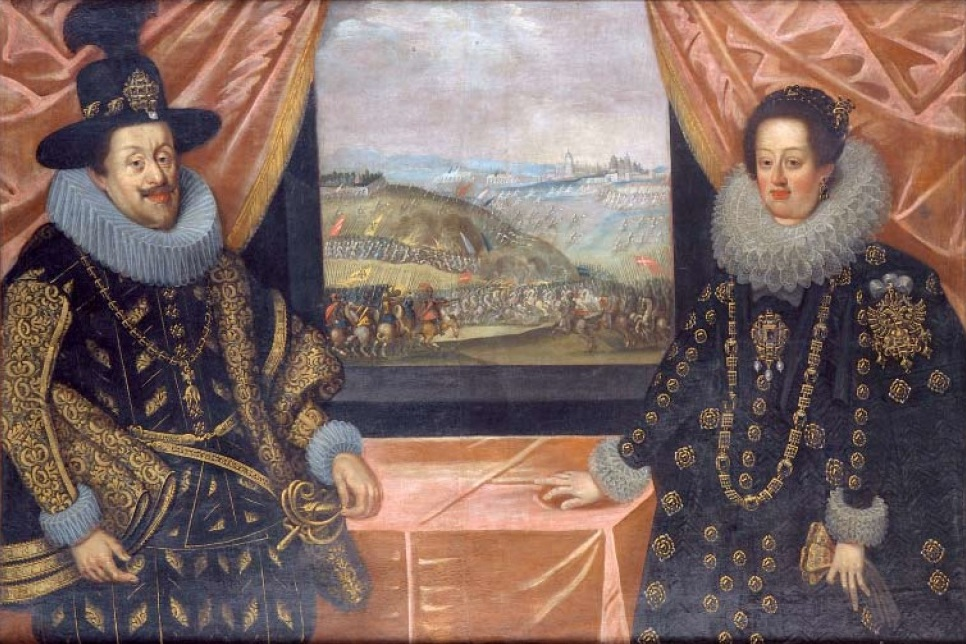
Ferdinand II, Holy Roman Emperor and his second wife, Eleonora Gonzaga, Princess of Mantua. Even though they had no children, their marriage was perceived to be a "happy" one.

In 1600, Ferdinand married Maria Anna of Bavaria, daughter of Duke William V, Duke of Bavaria. They had seven children:

- Archduchess Christine (25 May 1601 – 12/21 June 1601)
- Archduke Charles (25 May 1603)
- Archduke John-Charles (1 November 1605 – 26 December 1619)
- Ferdinand III (13 July 1608 – 2 April 1657) married:
  - 1631 Infanta Maria Anna of Spain
  - 1648 Maria Leopoldine of Austria
  - 1651 Eleonora Gonzaga (born 1630)
- Maria Anna of Austria (13 January 1610 – 25 September 1665)
- Archduchess Cecilia Renata of Austria (16 July 1611 – 24 March 1644), who married her cousin Władysław IV Vasa, King of Poland.
- Archduke Leopold Wilhelm of Austria (1614–1662).

In 1622, he married Eleonore of Mantua (Gonzaga) (1598–1655), the daughter of Duke Vincenzo I of Gonzaga of Mantua and Eleonora de' Medici, at Innsbruck. They had no children.

== Titles ==
Coat of arms of Ferdinand II

Ferdinand II, by the grace of God elected Holy Roman Emperor, forever August, King in Germany, King of Hungary, Bohemia, Dalmatia, Croatia, Slavonia, Rama, Serbia, Galicia, Lodomeria, Cumania, Bulgaria, Archduke of Austria, Duke of Burgundy, Brabant, Styria, Carinthia, Carniola, Margrave of Moravia, Duke of Luxemburg, of the Higher and Lower Silesia, of Württemberg and Teck, Prince of Swabia, Count of Habsburg, Tyrol, Kyburg and Goritia, Marquess of the Holy Roman Empire, Burgovia, the Higher and Lower Lusace, Lord of the Marquisate of Slavonia, of Port Naon and Salines, etc. etc.

== See also ==
- Kings of Germany family tree. He was related to every other king of Germany.

== Bibliography ==
- Bireley, Robert (2014). Ferdinand II, Counter-Reformation Emperor, 1578–1637. Cambridge University Press. ISBN 978-1-107-06715-8.
- Kontler, László (1999). Millennium in Central Europe: A History of Hungary. Atlantisz Publishing House. ISBN 963-9165-37-9.
- MacCulloch, Diarmaid (2009). The Reformation: A History. Viking. ISBN 978-0-670-03296-9.
- Mikulec, Jiří (2011). "Baroque Absolutism (1620–1740)". In Pánek, Jaroslav; Tůma, Oldřich (eds.). A History of the Czech Lands. Charles University. pp. 233–259. ISBN 978-80-246-1645-2.
- Pánek, Jaroslav (2011). "The Czech Estates in the Habsburg Monarchy (1526–1620)". In Pánek, Jaroslav; Tůma, Oldřich (eds.). A History of the Czech Lands. Charles University. pp. 191–229. ISBN 978-80-246-1645-2.
- Parker, Geoffrey, ed. (1997) [1984]. The Thirty Years' War (2nd ed.). Routledge. ISBN 978-0-415-15458-1.
- Whaley, Joachim (2012). Germany and the Holy Roman Empire, Volume I: Maximilian I to the Peace of Westphalia, 1493–1648. Oxford University Press. ISBN 978-0-19-968882-1.
- Wilson, Peter Hamish (2009). The Thirty Years War: Europe's Tragedy. The Belknap Press of Harvard University Press. ISBN 978-0-674-03634-5.

Ferdinand II, Holy Roman Emperor House of Habsburg Born: 9 July 1578 Died: 15 February 1637
Regnal titles
Preceded by Albert VII, Archduke of Austria	Archduke of Further Austria; 1619 – 1623	Succeeded by Leopold V, Archduke of Austria
Preceded by Albert VII, Archduke of Austria	Archduke of Austria; 1619 – 1637	Succeeded by Ferdinand III, Holy Roman Emperor
Preceded by Charles II, Archduke of Austria	Archduke of Inner Austria; 1590 – 1637	Succeeded by Ferdinand III, Holy Roman Emperor
Preceded by Matthias, Holy Roman Emperor		Succeeded by Ferdinand III, Holy Roman Emperor
Preceded by Matthias, Holy Roman Emperor	King in Germany; King of Hungary and Croatia; 1618 – 1637	Succeeded by Ferdinand III, Holy Roman Emperor
Preceded by Matthias, Holy Roman Emperor	Holy Roman Emperor; 1619 – 1637	Succeeded by Ferdinand III, Holy Roman Emperor
Preceded by Matthias, Holy Roman Emperor	King of Bohemia; 1617 – 1619	Succeeded by Frederick V, Elector Palatine
Preceded by Frederick V, Elector Palatine	King of Bohemia; 1620 – 1637	Succeeded by Ferdinand III, Holy Roman Emperor
