= Brothers' Quarrel =

Early 17th century conflict

The Brothers' Quarrel (German: Bruderzwist) was a conflict between Rudolf II, Holy Roman Emperor and his brother, Matthias in the early 17th century.

Their other brothers (Maximilian III and Albert VII) and their cousins, especially Ferdinand II and Leopold V, were also deeply involved in the dispute. The family feud weakened the Habsburgs' position and enabled the estates of their realms to win widespread political and religious concessions.

The 19th-century Austrian writer Franz Grillparzer dedicated a play to the events.

== Sources ==
- Bireley, Robert (2014). Ferdinand II, Counter-Reformation Emperor, 1578–1637. Cambridge University Press. ISBN 978-1-107-06715-8.
- Wilson, Peter Hamish (2009). The Thirty Years War: Europe's Tragedy. Harvard University Press. ISBN 978-0-674-03634-5.
