= Charles of Habsburg =

Charles of Habsburg may refer to:

- Charles V, Holy Roman Emperor (1516–1556)
- Charles II of Austria (1564–1590)
- Charles II of Spain (1661–1700)
- Charles VI, Holy Roman Emperor (1711–1740)
- Charles I of Austria (1916–1918)
