= Mausoleum of Emperor Ferdinand II =

Mausoleum in Graz, Austria

Coordinates: 47°04′18″N 15°26′34″E

Mausoleum Emperor Ferdinand II
- Mausoleum Kaiser Ferdinands II
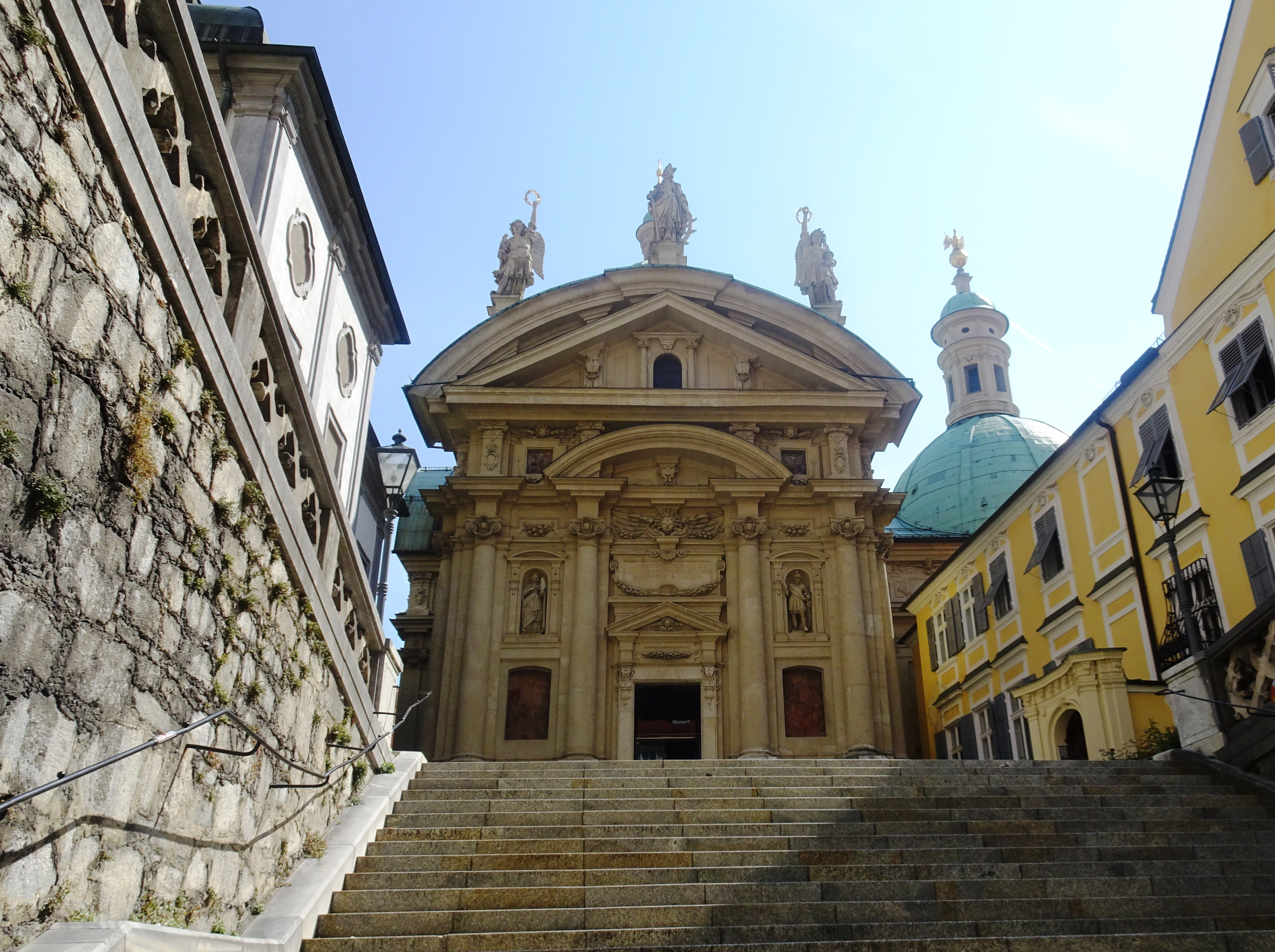
- Front View of the Mausoleum

General information
- Status: Completed
- Type: Mausoleum
- Architectural style: Baroque and Renaissance Mannerism
- Location: Burggasse 3, 8010 Graz, Österreich, Graz, Austria
- Year built: 82
- Construction started: 1614 (412 years ago)
- Construction stopped: 1696
- Owner: Landes Steiermark

Website
- https://graz-dom.graz-seckau.at/pfarre/6112/mausoleum

The Mausoleum of Emperor Ferdinand II in Graz was constructed beginning in 1614 under the patronage of Archduke Ferdinand II of Habsburg, who later became Holy Roman Emperor. It was intended to serve as a dynastic burial site and as a symbolic monument associated with the Catholic Counter Reformation in Inner Austria. During Ferdinand II’s reign, the Habsburg monarchy pursued policies that strengthened Catholic influence following the territorial and religious advances made by Protestantism in the region. In this context, the mausoleum was conceived as both a family crypt and a representation of religious and dynastic authority. According to scholarly research, Ferdinand II decided in 1614 to establish a burial site in Graz that would reflect both ecclesiastical and dynastic significance. He entrusted the planning and construction to his Italian court artist, Giovanni Pietro de Pomis. The project involved architects and sculptors over several decades and included elaborate Baroque decoration. The completed structure has been described by scholars as a "triumphal monument of Catholicism" and a "symbol of the Counter Reformation" in Inner Austria, reflecting its historical and religious significance during that period.

== Design and construction ==
The mausoleum complex consists of two connected structures, the Katharinenkirche (St. Catherine’s Church) and the adjoining oval burial chapel. The overall design was developed by Giovanni Pietro de Pomis (1569–1633), a Lombard born painter and architect. The church features a Latin cross floor plan, while the southern section is an oval central plan chapel, a form traditionally associated with the symbolism of the Resurrection. Construction began in 1614 on the site of a former cemetery chapel dedicated to St. Catherine. Progress was intermittent, after Ferdinand became Holy Roman Emperor in 1619 and relocated to Vienna, the pace of construction slowed. Around 1619–1620, Giovanni Pietro de Pomis modified the façade design, removing much of the original stucco and adding two segmental gables. By 1622, work on the roof was in progress, and in the mid-1630s, Pietro Valnegro, who succeeded De Pomis, completed the cupolas and a tall tower. Major exterior construction was largely finished by 1637. However, when Ferdinand died in 1637, the tomb chapel remained only partially completed, and he was interred in a vault that was not yet fully enclosed. The interior decoration was added at a later stage during the reign of Ferdinand’s grandson, Emperor Leopold I. In 1687, Leopold commissioned the young Graz born architect Johann Bernhard Fischer von Erlach to design the Baroque interior of both the church and the mausoleum chapel. The crypt was completed with frescoes and stuccowork by 1696, and the elaborate sculptural group known as the "Holy Sepulchre" was added in 1768–1769.

== Architectural style ==
The design combines elements of late Renaissance Mannerism and early Baroque architecture. The façades display characteristics typical of the Mannerist style, including layered gables, rusticated columns, and allegorical sculptures, arranged within a confined urban setting. One modern study describes it as "the largest and most impressive Habsburg mausoleum" and notes that it was "built in the mannerist style" that bridges the Renaissance and Baroque periods. The architect drew direct inspiration from Italian models, for example, the entrance façade resembles the Jesuit mother church Il Gesù in Rome, featuring a tall triangular pediment framed by segmental pediments. The burial chapel features an oval dome, which was the first of its kind to be constructed outside of Italy. The overall effect is characterized by a strong massing with dramatic Baroque accents. The horizontal façades are adorned with pilasters and sculptural details, while the soaring domes and lanterns, topped with the imperial eagle, cross, and sceptre, symbolize Habsburg power. The façade of the attached St. Catherine’s Church similarly combines Renaissance and Baroque motifs typical of 17th century Austria.

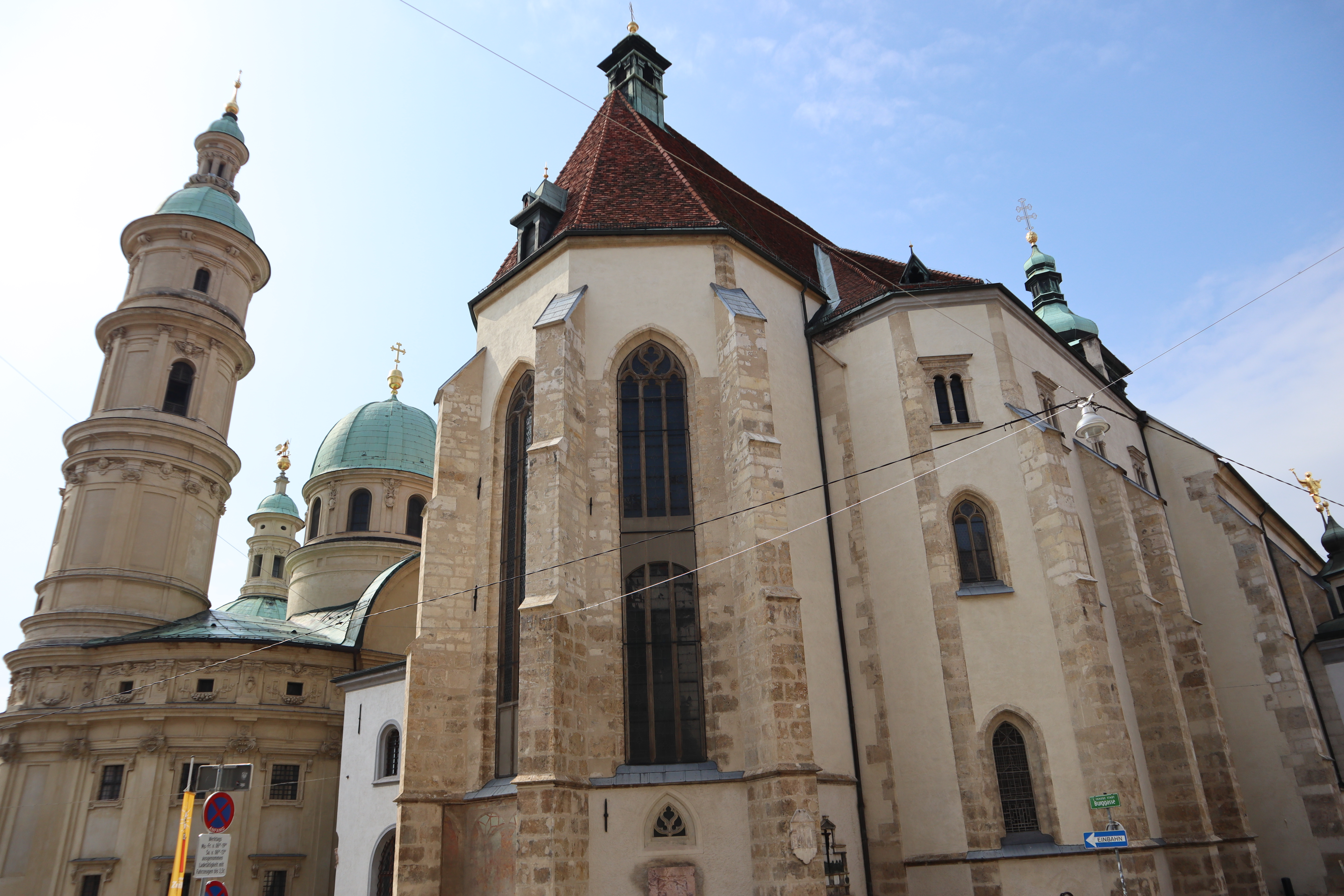
Exterior View of the Mausoleum

== Exterior features ==
The exterior of the complex displays Habsburg symbolism on every roofline. The west façade of St. Catherine’s Church features a life size sandstone sculpture of St. Catherine of Alexandria, the patroness of the Jesuit University, flanked by angels. Painted copper panels on the façade illustrate her life. These elements, along with figures of saints Porphyrius and Faustina, highlight the building’s Catholic and Jesuit associations, as well as its connection to the Counter Reformation. Above the church and mausoleum are two turquoise domes, each topped with dynastic symbols, the church dome features a cross, the mausoleum dome displays an imperial eagle holding an orb and sword, and the high tower is topped with a sceptre (which was later replaced). The façade of the mausoleum chapel features a monumental double arched portal, with two triumphal arches stacked, symbolizing Catholic victory. Statues on the roof, attributed to Sebastian Erlacher, complete the skyline. The church and chapel are linked in a compact configuration. Initially, the site was narrower, and the southwestern stairway was added later to provide a clearer view of the façades. The exterior combines Florentine (Italianate) elements with prominent Habsburg iconography, making the mausoleum one of Graz’s most distinctive Baroque landmarks.

== Interior and crypt ==
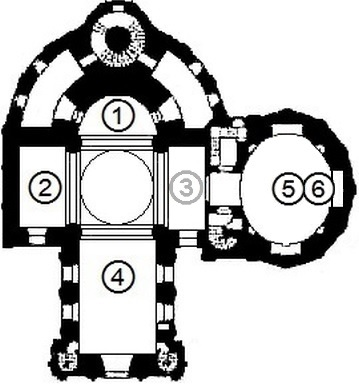
Floor plan of the Mausoleum: 1 – St. Catherine’s Altar; 2 – Virgin Mary Altar; 3 – Holy Sepulchre (1967–2002); 4 – Nave of St. Catherine’s Church with frescoes; 5 – Tomb chapel with crypt below.

The interior decoration is in the high Baroque style and was primarily completed in the late 17th century under Emperor Leopold I and Johann Bernhard Fischer von Erlach. In St. Catherine’s Church (the northern section), Fischer designed elaborate stucco altars and ornamental details for the apse and vault. Stuccoists Joseph Antonio Serenio, Girolamo Rossi, and Antonio Quadrio (1688–89) created intricate white relief work on the vaults, while fresco painter Franz Steinpichler depicted the apotheosis of the Habsburgs, including an image of Emperor Leopold I as the victor over the Turks at the Battle of Vienna in 1683. Marx Schokotnigg carved angelic statues for the altars between 1697 and 1701, while Antonio Bellucci painted the high altar altarpiece in 1699, depicting the Immaculate Conception. In the burial chapel (the oval mausoleum), Johann Bernhard Fischer von Erlach provided the interior design around 1687. His initial plan for a single large fresco was revised, and instead, Matthias Echter painted seventeen separate lunettes and vault scenes in 1689, illustrating Emperor Ferdinand II’s virtues and biblical themes related to the Resurrection. Fischer arranged these scenes within elaborate stucco work by Joseph Antonio Serenio and figures of putti by Marx Schokotnigg (1695–96), representing the virtues of Faith, Hope, Charity, and Justice. The "Holy Sepulchre" shrine, created by Veit Königer in 1768–69, is a prominent feature of the chapel. It consists of a life size tableau depicting Christ’s tomb and mourning figures, richly gilded, with a circular opening that reveals a red marble sarcophagus beneath.

Beneath the shrine is the crypt, accessible via stairs located under the chapel. The crypt’s plaster ceiling, dating to around 1640 and restored in 1694, is richly decorated and features coats of arms and funerary emblems representing the realms of Ferdinand II. At the center of the crypt is a red marble double sarcophagus, originally from the Grazer Klarissen monastery, featuring full length effigies of Archduke Karl II (Ferdinand II’s father) and his wife Maria Anna. However, only Archduchess Maria Anna is actually interred in the sarcophagus. The actual tombs of Ferdinand II and his wife Eleonore are embedded in the walls of the crypt. Each coffin is placed within a niche and marked by a simple inscribed plaque. A small "heart crypt" (German, Herzgrüftl) located behind the main crypt contains the embalmed hearts of Emperor Ferdinand II, his mother Maria of Bavaria, his wife Eleonore, and other members of the Habsburg family. Overall, the interior art and architecture reflect the religious and dynastic themes associated with Emperor Ferdinand II, and the mausoleum is considered one of the most significant Baroque works in Styria.

== Burials ==
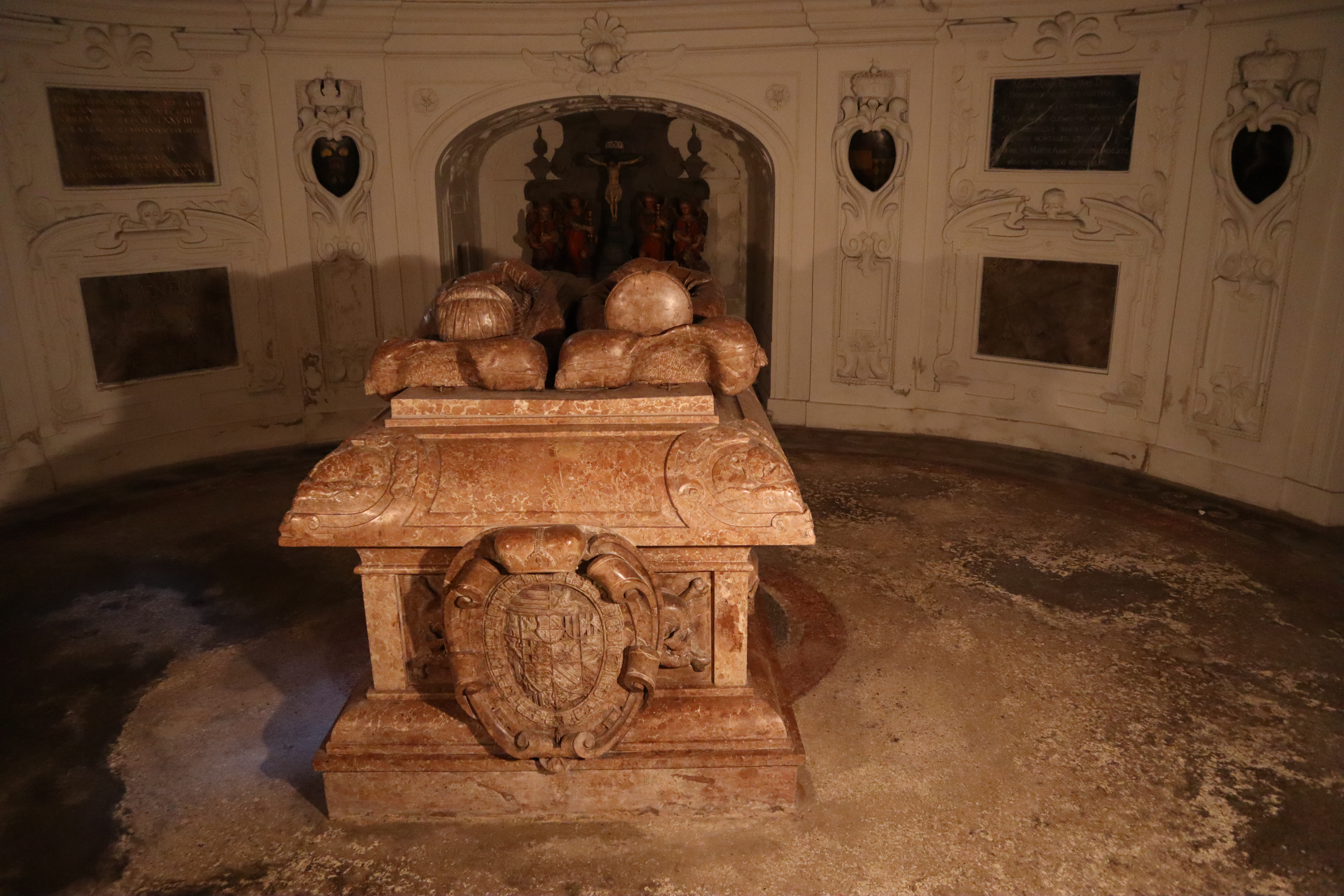
Crypt room with double sarcophagus (for the parents of Emperor Ferdinand II) and four wall niches for coffins.

As intended by its founder, the mausoleum contains the remains of Emperor Ferdinand II along with several other members of the Habsburg family. Ferdinand was entombed in 1637 in the vault of the oval chapel, with his burial site marked by a simple nameplate. His first wife, Archduchess Maria Anna of Bavaria, who died in 1616, is also buried in the mausoleum and is commemorated by an inscription. The red marble sarcophagus in the crypt contains the remains of Ferdinand’s mother, also named Archduchess Maria Anna of Bavaria, who died in 1608, the sarcophagus is accompanied by an effigy of her husband, Karl II, whose body is interred at Seckau. The coffins of Ferdinand II and his second wife Eleonore of Gonzaga (d. 1686) are placed in wall niches below the Holy Sepulchre, with their identities marked only by small tablets. The heart crypt contains the hearts of Ferdinand II, his mother, his wife, and other archdukes. No other major figures are buried in the mausoleum, making it primarily the dynastic tomb of Ferdinand II’s immediate family.

== Historical and political significance ==
The Ferdinand II Mausoleum was not only a sepulchral chapel but also a political monument. Its iconography and inscriptions were intended to convey Habsburg and Catholic supremacy. As one scholar notes, the architecture by De Pomis "symbolized an entire Inner Austrian era" and served as both an artistic expression and "documentation of a policy," reflecting Ferdinand II’s steadfast Counter Reformation rule. The building’s design, featuring images of saints and imperial eagles, positions it as "a triumphal monument of Catholicism in Inner Austria and a memorial to the victory over heresy." The mausoleum commemorates the suppression of Protestantism in the Habsburg lands, during which Ferdinand II closed churches, burned heretical books, and expelled dissenters, while also celebrating the restoration of Catholic order. In the urban context of Graz, the mausoleum, along with the Cathedral and fortress, forms part of the city's "Stadtkrone" or Crown of the city. The mausoleum contributes to one of the most picturesque views of Graz, with the green domes of the church and mausoleum alongside the Cathedral dominating the cityscape. This reflects the Italianate influence promoted by the emperor. The mausoleum is part of Graz’s UNESCO World Heritage historic center, inscribed in 1999, recognized as an "exemplary model of a Central European urban ensemble" shaped by Habsburg patronage. It remains a significant reminder of early 17th century Habsburg ambition and faith.

== Restoration and conservation ==
Over the centuries, the structure required periodic repairs. Notably, between 2002 and 2003, the mausoleum and its church underwent a comprehensive restoration. Extensive work on the exterior stabilized crumbling sandstone and stucco, and the copper crosses and crowns were regilded. Although parts of the underlying roofs were replaced, the original dome coverings were carefully preserved. Inside, conservation efforts addressed water damage and soot by revealing and cleaning the original frescoes and stucco, with some earlier restoration layers removed. A heating system was installed to allow year round use of the complex, though this has altered the acoustics and lighting, with electric lights being added. These interventions have ensured that the mausoleum retains its appearance, closely resembling its 17th century design. Earlier restoration efforts were often piecemeal, whereas the 2002–03 project addressed all parts of the building systematically.

== Current status ==
The Mausoleum of Ferdinand II is an active heritage monument and tourist attraction. It is maintained by the Graz Diocesan Museum and is open daily, typically from 9:00 to 17:00 in the summer, though it is closed on Mondays. The mausoleum is a prominent feature on top 10 lists of Graz's sights, attracting visitors with its distinctive "Florentine" domes beside the Cathedral. As part of the UNESCO World Heritage Historic Centre of Graz, the mausoleum is legally protected and open to public interpretation. Guided tours, often combined with visits to the cathedral, explain its unique Mannerist Baroque architecture and Habsburg heritage. In both scholarship and the city's identity, the Mausoleum of Ferdinand II is recognized as a masterpiece of Austrian Baroque funerary architecture and a symbol of Graz’s Habsburg past.

== See also ==
- House of Habsburg
- Emperor Ferdinand II
- Mausoleum
