= Treaty of Lieben =

1608 treaty

The Treaty of Lieben was signed on June 25, 1608, between Holy Roman Emperor Rudolf II and his brother, Matthias. Based on the terms of the treaty, Rudolf surrendered Hungary, Austrian territories near the Danube River, and Moravia to Matthias. In return, Matthias gave to the emperor the territories of Tyrol and Vorlande.

== See also ==
- List of treaties

== Sources ==
- Encyclopædia Britannica - Austria
