= Charles II of Austria =

Archduke of Inner Austria from 1564 to 1590

Charles II
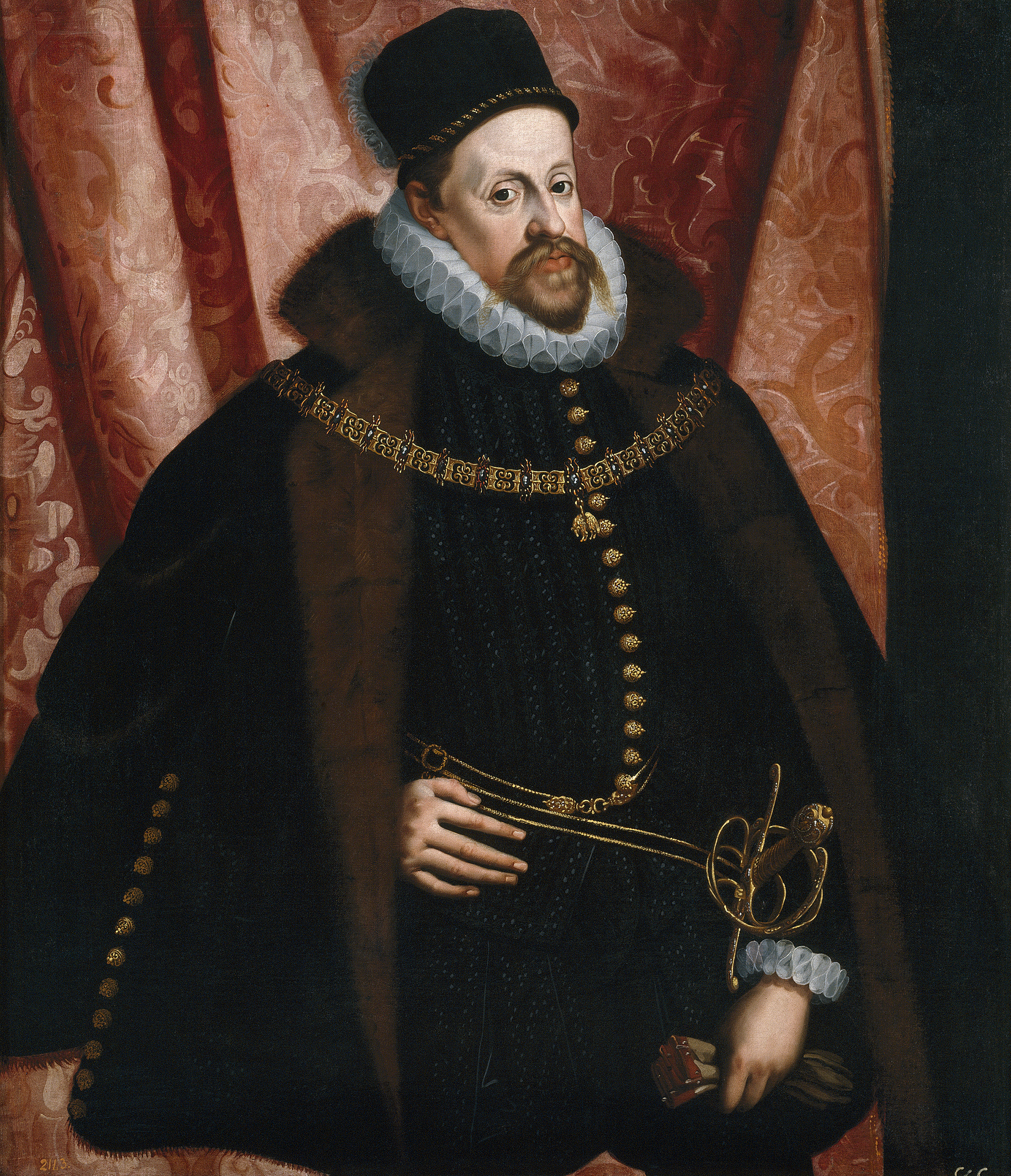
- Portrait of Archduke Charles II, by Bartolomé González y Serrano

Archduke of Inner Austria
- Reign: 25 July 1564 – 10 July 1590
- Predecessor: Ferdinand I
- Successor: Ferdinand III
- Born: 3 June 1540; Vienna, Archduchy of Austria
- Died: 10 July 1590 (aged 50); Graz, Duchy of Styria
- Burial: Seckau, Austria
- Spouse: Maria Anna of Bavaria (m. 1571)
- Issue: Anne, Queen of Poland and Sweden; Maria Christina, Princess of Transylvania; Archduchess Catherine Renata; Ferdinand II, Holy Roman Emperor; Archduchess Gregoria Maximiliana; Archduchess Eleanor; Archduke Maximilian Ernest; Margaret, Queen of Spain; Leopold V, Archduke of Further Austria; Constance, Queen of Poland; Maria Maddalena, Grand Duchess of Tuscany; Charles, Bishop of Wroclaw
- House: Habsburg
- Father: Ferdinand I, Holy Roman Emperor
- Mother: Anna of Bohemia and Hungary
- Religion: Catholic Church

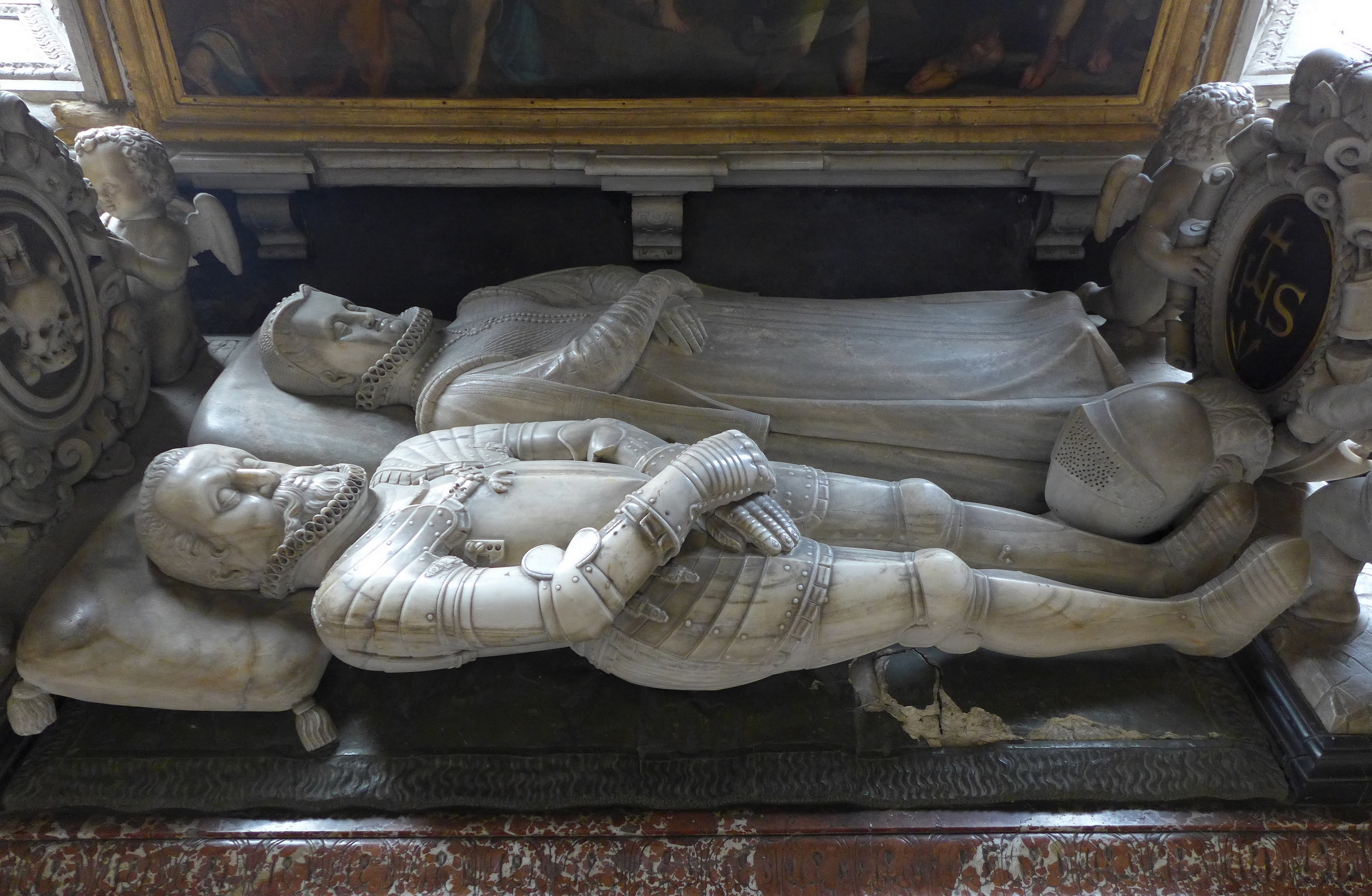
Gisants of Charles II Francis of Austria and his wife, Maria Anna of Bavaria, on the cenotaph of "Habsburg mausoleum", Seckau Abbey

Charles II Francis of Austria (German: Karl II. Franz von Innerösterreich) (3 June 1540 – 10 July 1590) was an Archduke of Austria and a ruler of Inner Austria (Styria, Carniola, Carinthia and Gorizia) from 1564. He was a member of the House of Habsburg.

== Biography ==
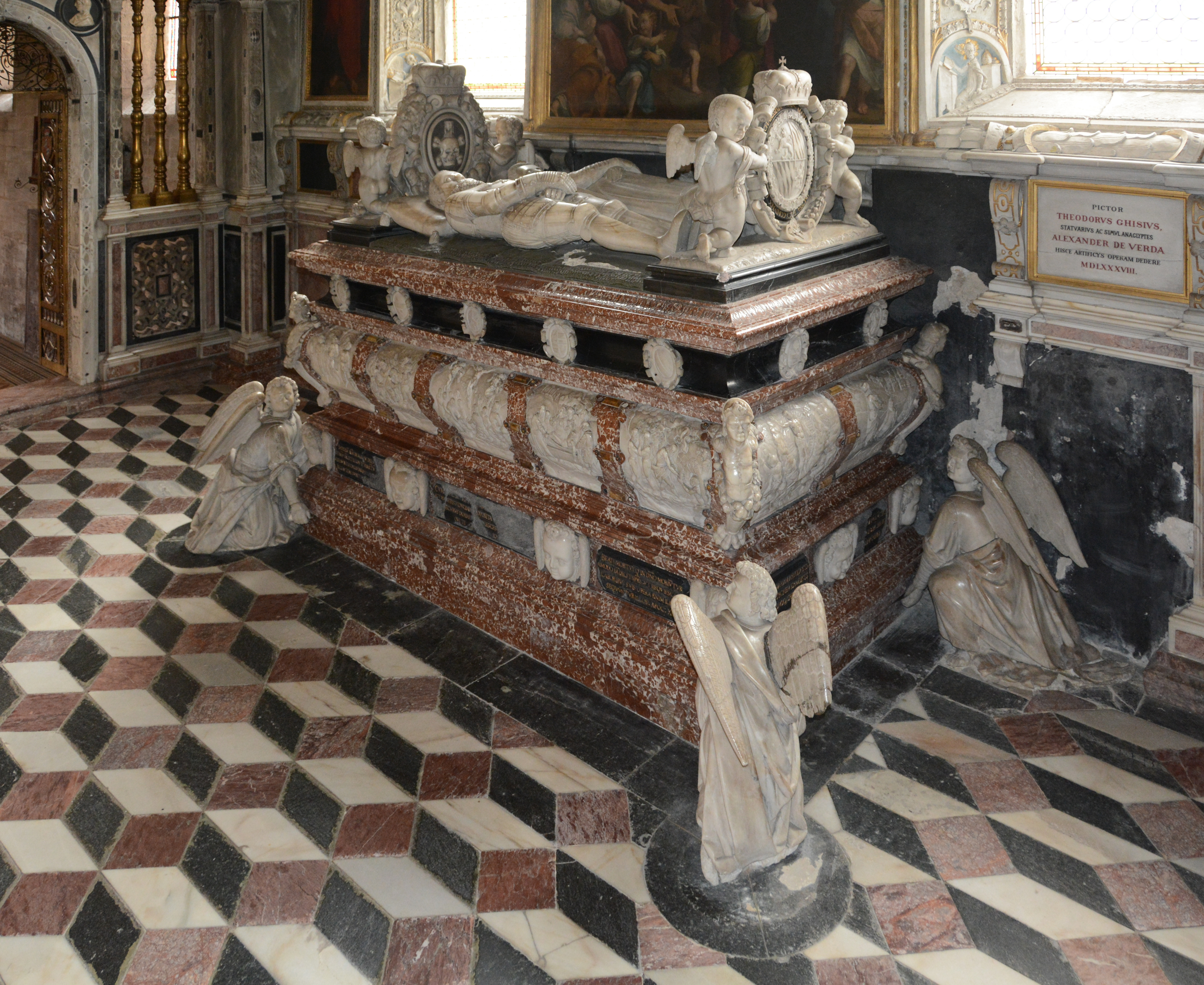
Seckau Abbey, "Habsburg mausoleum", cenotaph

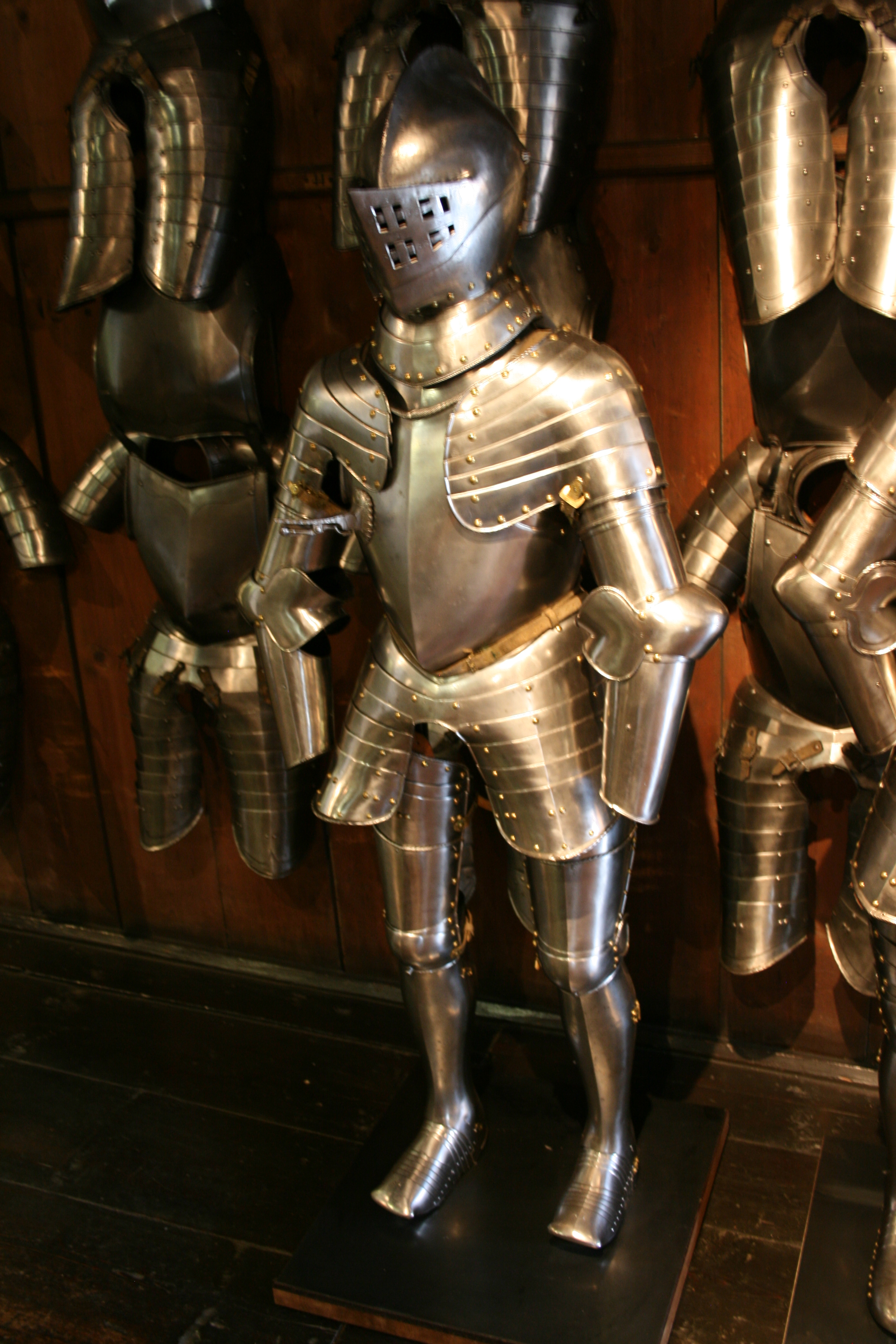
Armour of Archduke Charles II of Inner Austria in the Styrian Armoury in Graz

A native of Vienna, he was the third son of Ferdinand I, Holy Roman Emperor, and of Anne of Bohemia and Hungary, daughter of King Vladislaus II of Hungary and his wife, Anne of Foix-Candale. In 1559 and again from 1564 to 1568, there were negotiations for a marriage between Charles and Elizabeth I of England. Emperor Ferdinand I expected Elizabeth to promise in the proposed marriage treaty that Charles, as her widower, would succeed her if she died childless. The negotiations dragged on until Elizabeth decided that she would not marry the Archduke since he was a Catholic and the political coalition that formed the foundation upon which the monarch built her authority in England and Ireland demanded that the royal succession follow the Norman-Anglo-Saxon lineage.

In 1563, Charles was also a suitor of Mary, Queen of Scots, with her uncle Charles, Cardinal of Lorraine, advising her to marry Charles to obtain assistance in governing Scotland. Mary disagreed, as did Charles's older brother Maximilian.

Unlike his brother, Emperor Maximilian II, Charles was a religious Catholic and promoted the Counter-Reformation, such as by inviting the Jesuits to his territory. However, in 1572, he had to make significant concessions to the Inner Austrian Estates in the Religious Pacifications of Graz and in the 1578 Libellum of Bruck. In practice, that resulted in tolerance towards Protestantism.

As the Inner Austrian line had to bear the major burden of the wars against the Ottoman Empire, the fortress of Karlovac, in Croatia, was founded in 1579 to protect against invasions by the Ottoman Empire and it was named after him. Charles is also remembered as a benefactor of the arts and sciences. In particular, the composer Orlando di Lasso was one of his protégés, as was the music theorist Lodovico Zacconi.

In 1573, Charles founded the Akademisches Gymnasium in Graz, the oldest secondary school in Styria. In 1580, Charles founded a stud for horses of Andalusian origin in Lipica, Slovenia and thus played a leading role in the creation of the Lipizzan breed. In 1585, Charles founded the University of Graz, which is named Karl-Franzens-Universität after him.

He died at Graz in 1590.

Charles's mausoleum, in Seckau Abbey in which other members of the Habsburg family are also buried, is one of the most important edifices of the early Baroque in the south-eastern Alps. It was built from 1587 onwards by Alessandro de Verda and was completed by Sebastiano Carlone by 1612.

== Marriage and children ==
On 26 August 1571, Charles married his niece Maria Anna of Bavaria in Vienna. They had 15 children, 12 of whom lived to adulthood:

Name	Picture	Birth	Death	Notes
Archduke Ferdinand		Judenburg, 15 July 1572	Judenburg, 3 August 1572	Died in infancy.
Archduchess Anna		Graz, 16 August 1573	Warsaw, 10 February 1598	Married on 31 May 1592 to Sigismund III Vasa, King of Poland, Grand Duke of Lithuania and King of Sweden.
Archduchess Maria Christina		Graz, 10 November 1574	Hall in Tirol, Tyrol, 6 April 1621	Married on 6 August 1595 to Sigismund Bathory, Prince of Transylvania; they divorced in 1599.
Archduchess Catherine Renata		Graz, 4 January 1576	Graz, 29 June 1599	Died unmarried.
Archduchess Elisabeth		Graz, 13 March 1577	Graz, 29 January 1586	Died in childhood.
Archduke Ferdinand		Graz, 9 July 1578	Vienna, 15 February 1637	Holy Roman Emperor as Ferdinand II in 1619.
Archduke Charles		Graz, 17 July 1579	Graz, 17 May 1580	Died in infancy.
Archduchess Gregoria Maximiliana		Graz, 22 March 1581	Graz, 20 September 1597	Died unmarried.
Archduchess Eleanor		Graz, 25 September 1582	Hall in Tirol, Tyrol, 28 January 1620	Died unmarried.
Archduke Maximilian Ernest		Graz, 17 November 1583	Graz, 18 February 1616	Teutonic Knight.
Archduchess Margaret		Graz, 25 December 1584	El Escorial, 3 October 1611	Married on 18 April 1599 to Philip III, King of Spain.
Archduke Leopold		Graz, 9 October 1586	Schwaz, 13 September 1632	Archduke of Further Austria and Count of Tirol under the name Leopold V.
Archduchess Constance		Graz, 24 December 1588	Warsaw, 10 July 1631	Married on 11 December 1605 to Sigismund III Vasa, King of Poland and Grand Duke of Lithuania (widower of her older sister).
Archduchess Maria Magdalena		Graz, 7 October 1589	Passau, 1 November 1631	Married on 19 October 1608 Cosimo II de' Medici, Grand Duke of Tuscany.
Archduke Charles		Graz, 7 August 1590	Madrid, 28 December 1624	Bishop of Wroclaw and Brixen (1608–24), Grand Master of the Teutonic Order (1618–24).

== Notes ==
Charles II of Austria House of Habsburg Born: 3 June 1540 Died: 10 July 1590
Regnal titles
Preceded by Ferdinand I	Archduke of Inner Austria; 1564–1590	Succeeded by Ferdinand II
