= Robert L. Bireley =

American historian (1933–2018)

Robert L. Bireley (July 26, 1933 – March 14, 2018) was an American Jesuit historian of Counter-Reformation Central Europe.

== Life ==
Bireley was born in Evanston, Illinois, on July 26, 1933. He joined the Jesuits in 1951, making his final vows in 1974. He was ordained a priest in Germany in 1964.

He took degrees in Latin and History from Loyola University Chicago, in Philosophy from West Baden College in Indiana, and in Theology from Sankt Georgen Graduate School of Philosophy and Theology in Frankfurt am Main. In 1972 he completed a doctorate in History at Harvard University. He taught at Loyola University Chicago for 45 years.

Bireley received a Guggenheim Fellowship in 1982. He served as president of the American Catholic Historical Association (2008) and on the editorial boards of the Catholic Historical Review (1979–85) and Renaissance Quarterly (2000-3).

He died on March 14, 2018, in Wauwatosa, Wisconsin, aged 84.

== Works ==
- Politics and Religion in the Age of the Counterreformation: Emperor Ferdinand II, William Lamormaini, SJ, and the Formation of Imperial Policy (University of North Carolina Press, 1981)
- The Counter-Reformation Prince (University of North Carolina Press, 1990)
- The Refashioning of Catholicism, 1450–1700 (Macmillan, 1999)
- The Jesuits and the Thirty Years War (Cambridge, 2003)
- Ferdinand II: Counter-Reformation Emperor, 1578-1637 (Cambridge, 2014)
