= Descendants of Ferdinand II of Aragon and Isabella I of Castile =

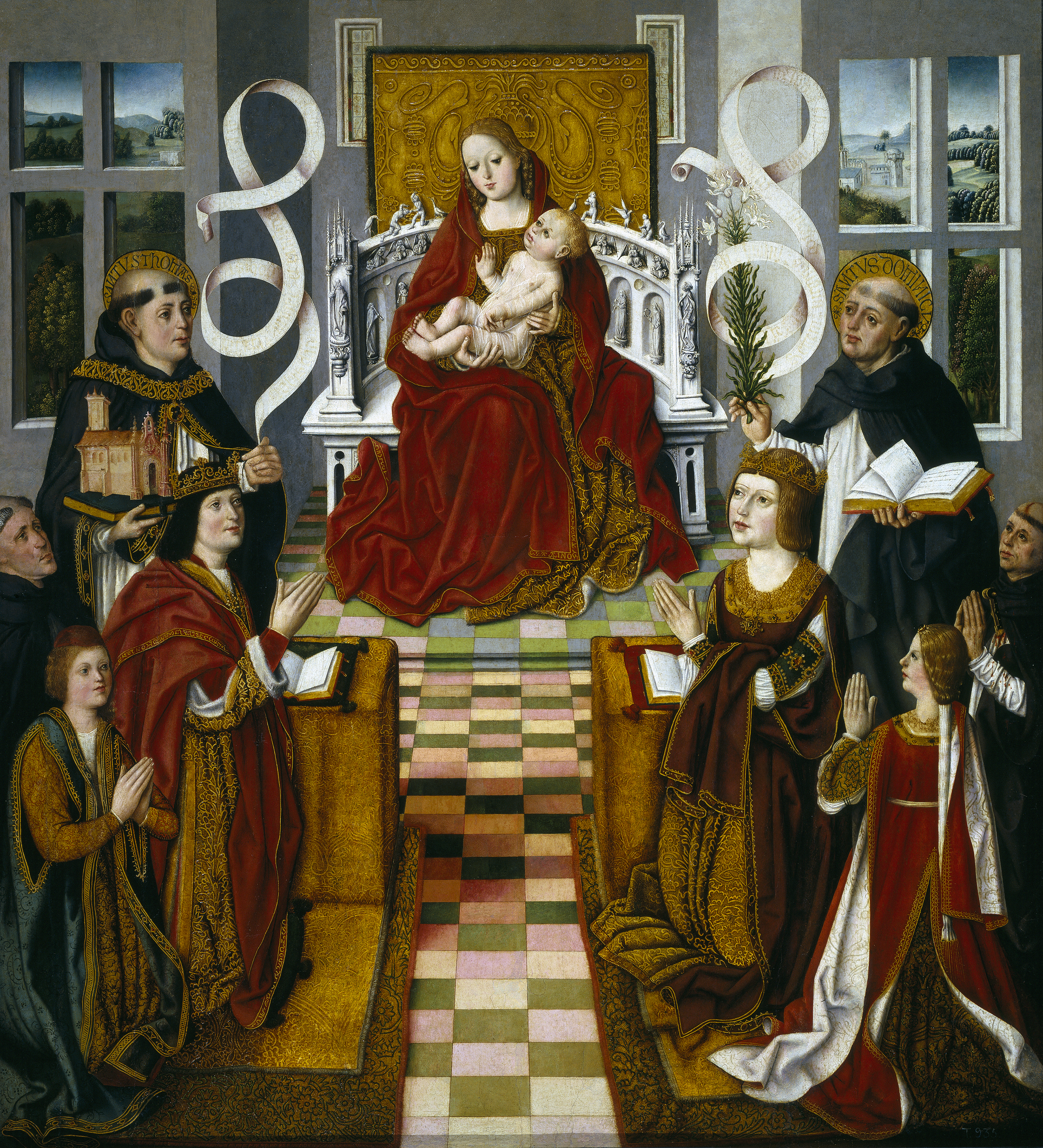
The painting Madonna of the Catholic Monarchs (La Virgen de los Reyes Católicos) by Pedro Berruguete includes the portraits of Ferdinand, Isabella and their children. The model for Baby Jesus was their grandson Miguel de Paz, who was briefly Crown Prince to Castile, Aragon and Portugal at the same time. The saints are Thomas Aquinas and Saint Dominic.

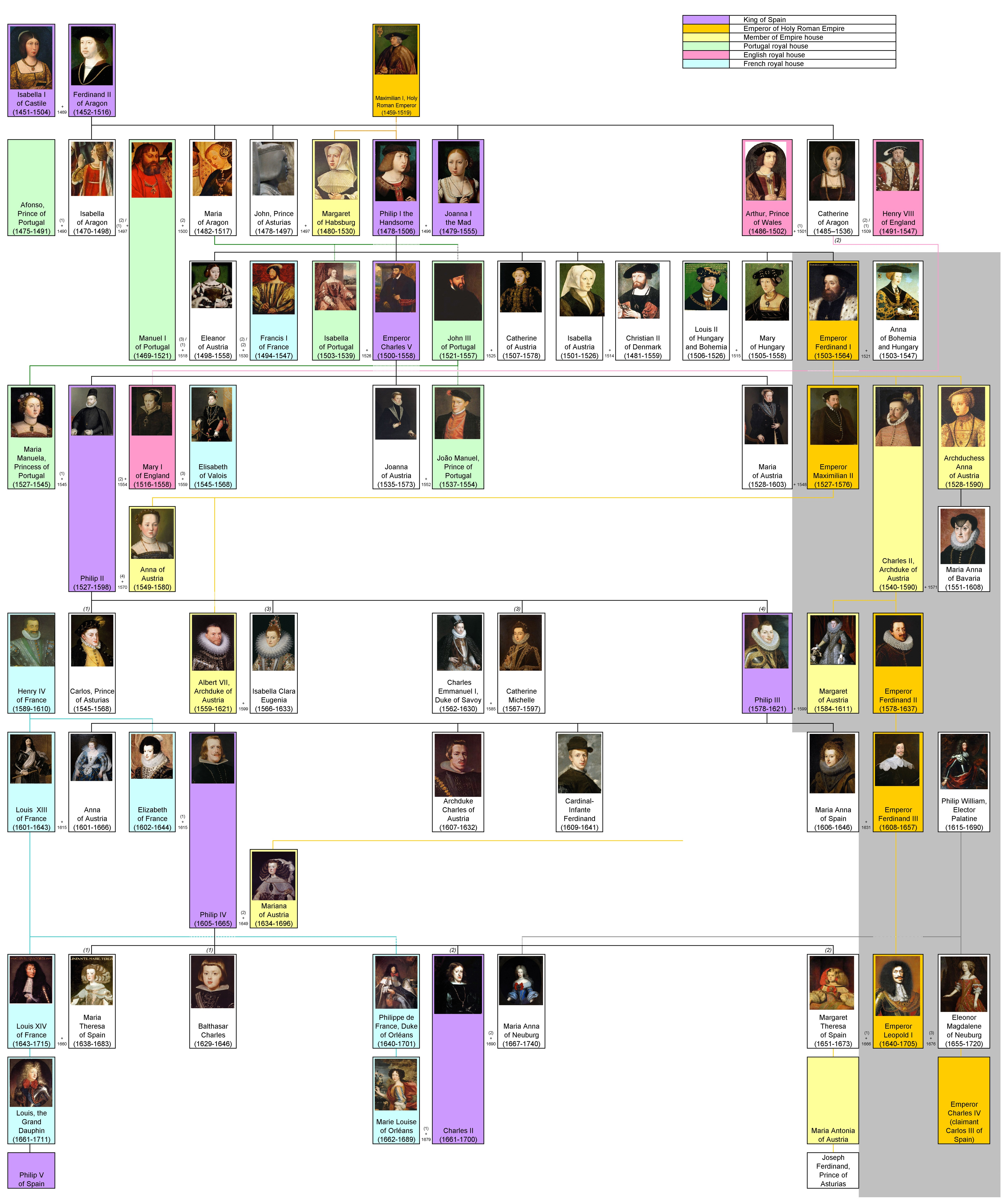
This family tree shows some of Ferdinand and Isabella's descendants (mainly the Spanish Habsburgs, some Austrian Habsburg and Louis XIII and XIV of France are also present).

Ferdinand II of Aragon's marriage to Isabella I of Castile produced seven children, five of whom survived birth and lived to adulthood. They arranged strategic political marriages for all of these children to powerful monarchs and well-connected women. Although several bloodlines were cut short and the rest initially intermarried to form a close-knit group centered around the House of Habsburg, this group became the most powerful family in Europe. Within only six generations of the Catholic Monarchs their offspring ruled in the Holy Roman Empire, the Kingdom of France, the Kingdom of Spain, the Kingdom of England, the Kingdom of Portugal (before, during and after the Iberian Union), the Archduchy of Austria with the Kingdom of Bohemia and the Kingdom of Hungary in personal union, the Kingdom of Poland with the Grand Duchy of Lithuania in personal union, Electorate of Brandenburg with the Duchy of Prussia in personal union, the Electorate of Saxony, the Duchy of Mantua, the Duchy of Montferrat, the Duchy of Parma, the Duchy of Lorraine and others.

Among the living descendants of Isabella I and Ferdinand II are all of the current European monarchs from hereditary monarchies (i.e. not Andorra and Vatican City). Felipe VI of Spain and Henri of Luxembourg are both descended in the male line from Philip V of Spain, whose grandmother Maria Theresa of Spain was a male-line descendant of Ferdinand and Isabella's daughter Joanna the Mad. Many other paths are possible to find due to interbreeding. Philippe of Belgium is also a descendant multiple times over. One such path goes through Leopold III of Belgium, Miguel I of Portugal and Charles IV of Spain back to Philip V again. Although the Protestant Reformation divided Europe in half in terms of royal intermarriage, through the children of Maria of Austria, Duchess Consort of Jülich-Cleves-Berg the bloodline also entered the Protestant noble houses and can therefore be traced to Britain, Scandinavia and the Netherlands. The most common line passes through Maria's great-great-granddaughter Princess Elisabeth Sophie of Saxe-Altenburg.

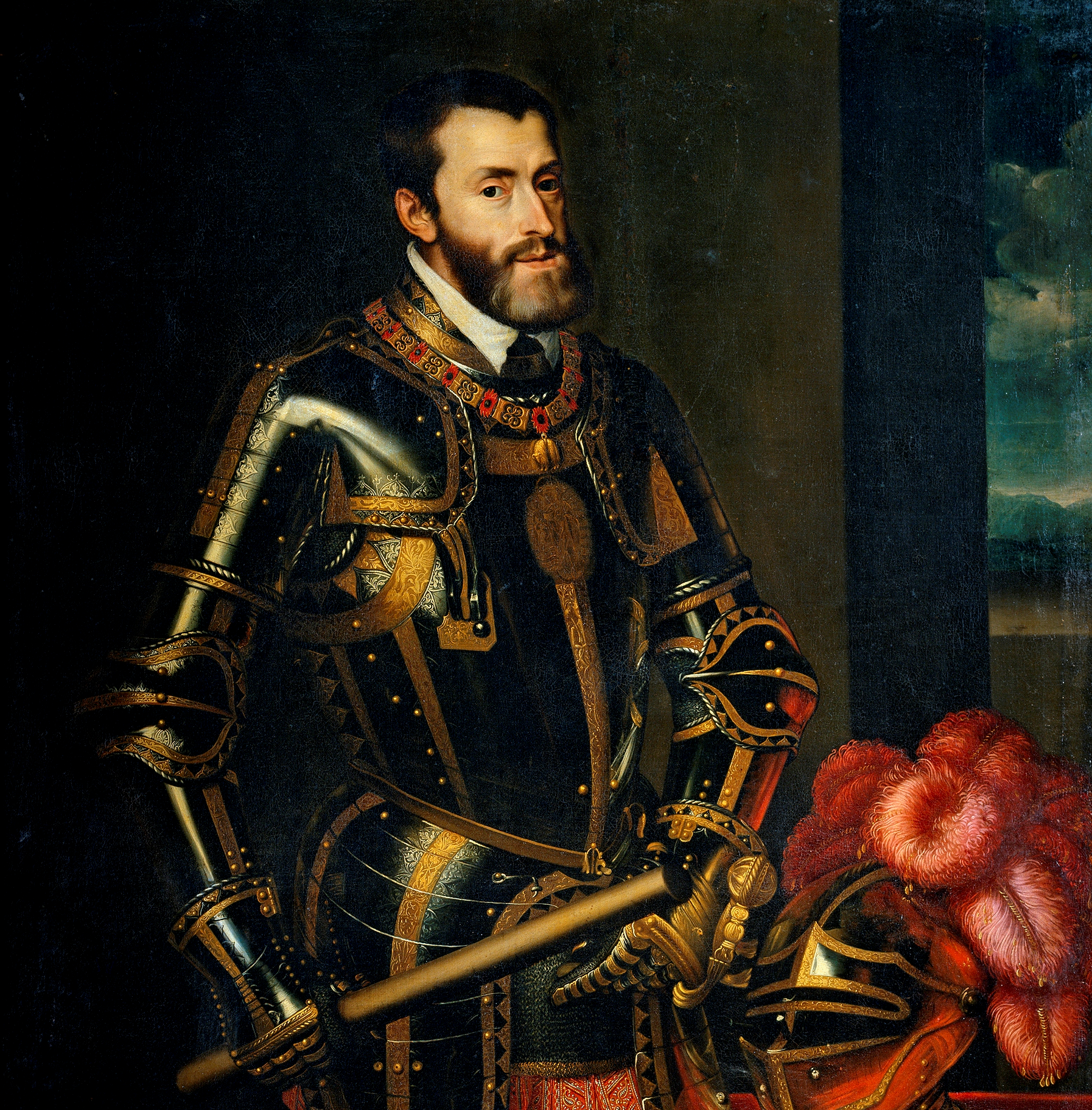
Charles V, Holy Roman Emperor (1500–1558), a grandson of Ferdinand and Isabella. Ruler over both the Holy Roman Empire and the Spanish Empire.

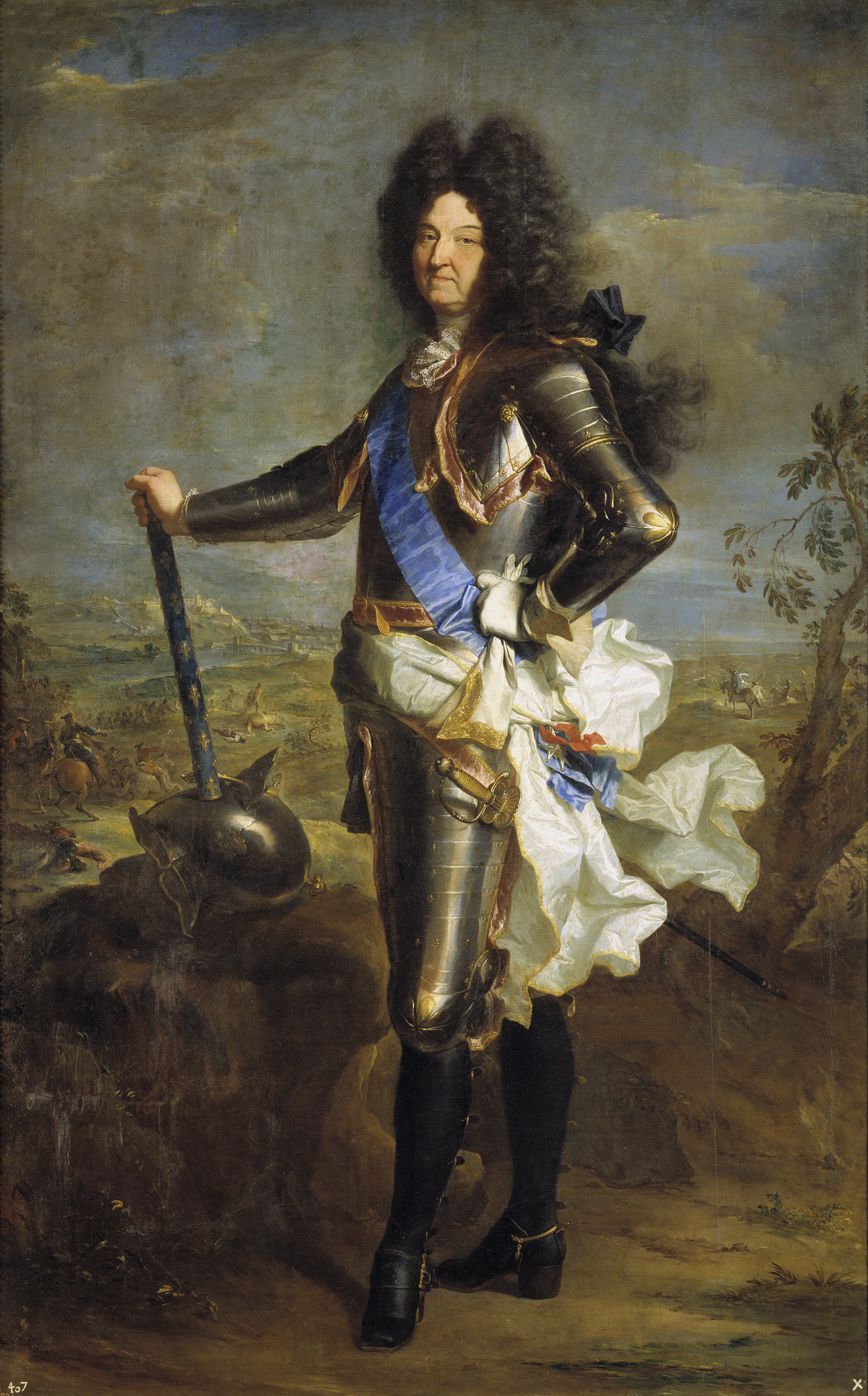
Louis XIV "the Sun King" of France (1638–1715), a great-great-great-great-grandson of Ferdinand and Isabella. Considered the foremost example of an absolute monarch.

Some British lines descend from Henrietta Maria of France, granddaughter of Joanna of Austria, Grand Duchess of Tuscany. Although her legitimate descendants in Britain were banished during the Glorious Revolution, many remain descending from the bastard children of Charles II and James VII. Princess Diana was and her sons and grandchildren are among this group by virtue of descent from Henry FitzRoy, 1st Duke of Grafton and Henrietta FitzJames. Queen Camilla is also in this group by descent from Anne Lennox, Countess Consort of Albemarle.

Charles III of the United Kingdom as well as every monarch of Britain since George III are descendants. George III's mother was Princess Augusta of Saxe-Gotha, a great-granddaughter of Elisabeth Sophie. Margrethe II of Denmark and Carl XVI Gustaf of Sweden share as their grandmother Princess Margaret of Connaught, a granddaughter of Queen Victoria, herself granddaughter to George III. Harald V of Norway's grandmother was Maud of Wales, another granddaughter of Victoria. A different line from Maria of Austria passes through Duchess Sophie of Prussia and her great-great-grandson William IV, Prince of Orange, whose grandson was elevated in rank to become William I of the Netherlands. Willem-Alexander of the Netherlands is his descendant, although not in the male line, but through a series of three queens-regnant of the Netherlands.

The two princes Albert II of Monaco and Hans-Adam II of Liechtenstein also have this blood. Albert's was introduced to the Grimaldi family by Lady Mary Victoria Douglas-Hamilton, granddaughter of Charles, Grand Duke of Baden. Charles was, among other ways this descent can be traced, a double great-grandson of Louis VIII, Landgrave of Hesse-Darmstadt, a great-grandson of Elisabeth Sophie. Hans-Adam has the bloodline from his grandmother Archduchess Elisabeth Amalie of Austria, who was both a Habsburg with near male-line descent (excluding Maria Theresa and Joanna the Mad) and a granddaughter of Miguel I of Portugal mentioned above as an ancestor of Philippe of Belgium.

== Children ==
Image	Name	Birth	Death	Family
	Infanta Isabella of Aragon	2 Oct 1470	23 Aug 1498	Married 1490, Afonso, Prince of Portugal, no issue. Married 1497, Manuel I, King of Portugal, had issue.
	John, Prince of Asturias	30 Jun 1478	4 Oct 1497	Married 1497, Margaret of Austria, no issue.
	Joanna I, Queen of Castile and Aragon	6 Nov 1479	12 Apr 1555	Married 1496, Philip IV, Duke of Burgundy, had issue.
	Maria of Aragon, Queen of Portugal	29 Jun 1482	7 Mar 1517	Married 1500, Manuel I, King of Portugal, had issue.
	Catherine of Aragon, Queen of England	16 Dec 1485	7 Jan 1536	1. Married 1501, Arthur, Prince of Wales, no issue.; 2. Married 1509, Henry VIII, King of England, had issue.

== Grandchildren ==
=== Children of Isabella of Aragon, Queen of Portugal ===
Isabella of Aragon first married in 1490 Afonso, Hereditary Prince of Portugal, who died the next year following a fall from his horse. She married his cousin Manuel I of Portugal, known as 'the fortunate' in 1497. Together, they had one son. She died within an hour after her son's birth.

Image	Name	Birth	Death	Family
	Miguel da Paz, Prince of Portugal	23 August 1498	19 July 1500	Died in infancy.

=== Children of Joanna I of Castille ===
Joanna I of Castille, later known as Joanna the Mad, married Philip the Handsome in 1496. At the time of the marriage, she was third in line to the throne behind her brother and older sister Isabella. Following the death of both, Joanna became heir.

Image	Name	Birth	Death	Family
	Eleanor of Austria, Queen of Portugal	15 November 1498	25 February 1558	Married 1518, Manuel I of Portugal, had two children. Married 1530, Francis I of France, no issue.
	Charles V, Holy Roman Emperor	24 February 1500	21 September 1558	Married 1526, Isabella of Portugal, had issue. Charles also had several illegitimate children including; Margaret of Parma (1522–1586); Joanna of Austria (1522–1530); Tadea della Penna (1523 – c. 1562); Cornelis de Hooghe (1541–1583), Dutch cartographer; John of Austria (1547–1578)
	Isabella of Austria, Queen of Denmark, Norway, and Sweden	18 July 1501	19 January 1526	Married 1514, Christian II of Denmark, had issue.
	Ferdinand I, Holy Roman Emperor	10 March 1503	25 July 1564	Married 1521, Anne of Bohemia and Hungary and had issue.
	Mary of Austria, Queen of Hungary	15 September 1505	18 October 1558	Married 1515, Louis II of Hungary, had no issue.
	Catherine of Austria, Queen of Portugal	14 January 1507	12 February 1578	Married 1529, John III of Portugal and had issue.

=== Children of Maria of Aragon, Queen consort of Portugal ===
Maria of Aragon married Manuel I of Portugal in 1500, the widower of her older sister Isabella.

Image	Name	Birth	Death	Family
	John III of Portugal	6 June 1502	11 June 1557	Married 1525, Catherine of Austria (Daughter of Joanna I and Philip the Handsome) and had issue. John III also had an illegitimate child; Duarte, Archbishop of Braga (1529 - 11 November 1543)
	Isabella of Portugal, Holy Roman Empress	24 October 1503	1 May 1539	Married 1526, Charles V, Holy Roman Emperor, had issue.
	Beatrice of Portugal, Duchess of Savoy	31 December 1504	8 January 1538	Married 1504 Charles III, Duke of Savoy, had issue.
	Luís of Portugal, Duke of Beja	3 March 1506	27 November 1555	Never married, but had an illegitimate son António, Prior of Crato, who was claimant to the Portuguese throne.
	Infante Ferdinand, Duke of Guarda	5 June 1507	7 November 1534	Married Guiomar Coutinho, 5th Countess of Marialva and 3rd Countess of Loulé. They had two children. Luisa (1531 - October 1534) and a son (born 1 August 1533) who died shortly after birth.
	Cardinal-Infante Afonso of Portugal	23 April 1509	21 April 1540	
	Infanta Maria	1511	1513	Died young.
	Henry, Cardinal-King of Portugal	31 January 1512	31 January 1580	Upon inheriting the Kingdom of Portugal, Henry sought to be released from his vows so that he might marry and continue the House of Aviz. Pope Gregory XIII did not allow this, not wanting to antagonise Philip II of Spain, his successor.
	Duarte, Duke of Guimarães	7 October 1515	20 September 1540	Married 1537 Isabel of Braganza and had issue.
	Infante António	8 September 1516	1 November 1516	Died in infancy.

=== Children of Catherine of Aragon, Queen consort of England ===
Catherine of Aragon first married Arthur, Prince of Wales in 1501, though he died the following year. She married his brother Henry VIII of England in 1509 and had issue. Due to her perceived inability to give the King a surviving son, the marriage was annulled in 1533.

Image	Name	Birth	Death	Family
	Henry, Duke of Cornwall	1 January 1511	22 February 1511	Died suddenly, with no recorded cause of death.
	Mary I of England	18 February 1516	17 November 1558	Married her cousin Philip II of Spain in 1554, but had no issue.

== Great-Grandchildren ==
=== Children of Eleanor of Austria, Queen consort of Portugal and France ===
Eleanor of Austria married first Manuel I of Portugal in 1518, the widower of two of her aunts, Isabella and Maria of Aragon. They had two children. Following the death of her husband, Eleanor remarried in 1530 to Francis I of France; he often ignored her and as such, the marriage remained childless.

Image	Name	Birth	Death	Family
	Infante Charles	18 February 1520	15 April 1521	Died in infancy.
	Maria, Duchess of Viseu	18 June 1521	10 October 1577	Never married and had no issue.

=== Children of Charles V, Holy Roman Emperor and Isabella of Portugal ===
Charles V married his first cousin Isabella of Portugal, daughter of Manuel I of Portugal and Maria of Aragon, in 1526. The marriage is regarded as a happy one, the couple had five surviving children.

Image	Name	Birth	Death	Family
	Philip II of Spain	21 May 1527	13 September 1598	Married Maria Manuela, Princess of Portugal, his double first cousin, in 1543. They had one son.: Carlos, Prince of Asturias (8 July 1545 – 24 July 1568), no issue.; Married Mary I of England in 1554. She was his first cousin once removed, as daughter of Catherine of Aragon (see above). They had no issue. Married 1559 Elisabeth of Valois, and had issue.: Isabella Clara Eugenia, Lady of the Netherlands (12 August 1566 – 1 December 1633), no issue.; Catherine Michaela of Austria (10 October 1567 – 6 November 1597), married and had issue.; Joan (born and died 3 October 1568); Married 1570 his niece, Anna of Austria, and had issue.: Ferdinand, Prince of Asturias (4 December 1571 – 18 October 1578), died in childhood.; Carlos Lorenzo (12 August 1573 – 30 June 1575), died in infancy.; Diego, Prince of Asturias (15 August 1575 – 21 November 1582), died in childhood.; Philip III of Spain (3 April 1578 – 31 March 1621), married and had issue.; Maria (14 February 1580 – 5 August 1583)
	Maria of Austria, Holy Roman Empress	21 June 1528	26 February 1603	Married 1548 her first cousin Maximilian II, Holy Roman Emperor, and had issue.: Anna of Austria, Queen of Spain (1 November 1549 – 26 October 1580), married and had issue (see above).; Ferdinand (28 March 1551 – 25 June 1552), died in infancy.; Rudolf II, Holy Roman Emperor (18 July 1552 – 20 January 1612), had illegitimate issue.; Archduke Ernest of Austria (15 July 1553 – 12 February 1595), no issue.; Elisabeth of Austria, Queen of France (5 July 1554 – 22 January 1592), married without issue.; Marie (27 July 1555 – 25 June 1556), died in infancy.; Matthias, Holy Roman Emperor (24 February 1557 – 20 March 1619), married without issue.; Maximilian III, Archduke of Austria (12 October 1558 – 2 November 1618), no issue.; Albert VII, Archduke of Austria (13 November 1559 – 13 July 1621), married without issue.; Archduke Wenceslaus of Austria (9 March 1561 – 22 September 1578), no issue.; Frederick (21 June 1562 – 16 January 1563), died in infancy.; Marie (19 February 1564 – 26 March 1564), died in infancy.; Charles (26 September 1565 – 23 May 1566), died in infancy.; Archduchess Margaret of Austria (25 January 1567 – 5 July 1633), no issue.; Eleanor (4 November 1568 – 12 March 1580), died in childhood.
	Infante Ferdinand	22 November 1529	13 July 1530	Died in infancy.
	Joanna of Austria, Princess of Portugal	26 June 1535	7 September 1573	Married her first cousin João Manuel, Prince of Portugal in 1552, had issue.: Sebastian, King of Portugal (20 January 1554 - 4 August 1578)
	Infante Juan	19 October 1537	20 March 1538	Died in infancy.

=== Children of Isabella of Austria, Queen consort of Denmark, Norway, and Sweden ===
Isabella married Christian II of Denmark in 1514 and had five children.

Image	Name	Birth	Death	Family
	John of Denmark	21 February 1518	11 August 1532	Died young.
	Philip Ferdinand	4 July 1519	1519	Died in infancy.
	Maximilian	4 July 1519	1519	Died in infancy.
	Dorothea of Denmark, Electress Palatine	10 November 1520	31 May 1580	Married 1535 Frederick II, Elector Palatine, but had no issue.
	Christina of Denmark, Duchess of Milan and Lorraine	November 1521	10 December 1590	Married 1534 Francesco II Sforza without issue. Married 1541 Francis I, Duke of Lorraine, and had issue.: Charles III, Duke of Lorraine (18 February 1543 – 14 May 1608), married and had issue.; Renata of Lorraine (20 April 1544 – 22 May 1602), married and had issue.; Dorothea of Lorraine (24 May 1545 – 2 June 1621), married without issue.

=== Children of Ferdinand I, Holy Roman Emperor ===
Ferdinand I married 1521 Anne of Bohemia and Hungary and had issue.

Image	Name	Birth	Death	Family
	Elizabeth of Austria	9 July 1526	15 June 1545	Married 1543 Sigismund II Augustus, without issue.
	Maximilian II, Holy Roman Emperor	31 July 1527	12 October 1576	Married 1548 his first cousin Maria of Austria and had issue (see above).
	Archduchess Anna of Austria	7 July 1528	16/17 October 1590	Married 1546 Albert V, Duke of Bavaria and had issue.: Charles (born and died 1547); William V, Duke of Bavaria (29 September 1548 – 17 February 1626), married with issue.; Ferdinand of Bavaria (20 January 1550 – 30 January 1608), married morganatically with issue.; Maria Anna of Bavaria (21 March 1551 – 29 April 1608), married with issue.; Maximiliana Maria of Bavaria (4 July 1552 – 11 July 1614), never married.; Friedrich (26 July 1553 – 18 April 1554), died in infancy.; Ernest of Bavaria (17 December 1554 – 17 February 1612), Archbishop of Cologne.
	Ferdinand II, Archduke of Austria	14 June 1529	24 January 1595	Married 1557 Philippine Welser morganatically and had issue.: Margrave Andrew of Burgau (15 June 1558 – 12 November 1600), had illegitimate issue.; Charles, Margrave of Burgau (22 November 1560 – 30 October 1618), married with illegitimate issue.; Philip of Austria (7 August 1562 – 9 January 1563); Maria of Austria (7 August 1562 – 25 January 1563); Married 1582 Anna Juliana Gonzaga and had issue.: Archduchess Anna Eleonore of Austria (26 June 1583 – 15 January 1584); Archduchess Maria of Austria (16 June 1584 – 2 March 1649), a nun.; Archduchess Anna of Austria (4 October 1585 – 14 December/15 December 1618), married with issue.
	Maria of Austria, Duchess of Jülich-Cleves-Berg	15 May 1531	11 December 1581	Married 1546 William, Duke of Jülich-Cleves-Berg and had issue.: Marie Eleonore of Cleves (16 June 1550 – 1 June 1608), married with issue.; Anna of Cleves (1 March 1552 – 6 October 1632), married with issue.; Magdalene of Jülich-Cleves-Berg (2 November 1553 – 30 August 1633), married with issue.; Karl Friedrich of Jülich-Cleves-Berg (28 April 1555 – 9 February 1575), no issue.; Elizabeth (1556–1561); Sibylle of Jülich-Cleves-Berg (26 August 1557 – 1628), married without issue.; John William, Duke of Jülich-Cleves-Berg (28 May 1562 – 25 March 1609), married without issue.
	Archduchess Magdalena of Austria	14 August 1532	10 September 1590	A nun. Never married and had no issue.
	Catherine of Austria, Queen of Poland	15 September 1533	28 February 1572	Married 1549 Francesco III Gonzaga without issue. Married 1553 Sigismund II Augustus without issue.
	Archduchess Eleanor of Austria	2 November 1534	5 August 1594	Married 1561 Guglielmo Gonzaga, Duke of Mantua with issue.: Vincenzo I Gonzaga (21 September 1562 – 9 February 1612), married with issue.; Margherita Gonzaga, Duchess of Ferrara (27 May 1564 – 6 January 1618), married without issue.; Anna Juliana Gonzaga (17 January 1566 – 3 August 1621), married with issue.
	Archduchess Margaret of Austria	16 February 1536	12 March 1567	A nun. Never married and had no issue.
	Archduke John of Austria	10 April 1538	20 March 1539	Died in childhood.
	Archduchess Barbara of Austria	30 April 1539	19 September 1572	Married 1565 Alfonso II d'Este without issue.
	Charles II, Archduke of Austria	3 June 1540	10 July 1590	Married 1571 Maria Anna of Bavaria with issue.: Archduke Ferdinand (15 July 1572 - 3 August 1572), died in infancy.; Anne of Austria, Queen of Poland (16 August 1573 – 10 February 1598), married with issue.; Maria Christina, Princess of Transylvania (10 November 1574 – 6 April 1621), married without issue.; Archduchess Catherine Renata of Austria( 4 January 1576 – 29 June 1599), died unmarried.; Archduchess Elisabeth (13 March 1577 - 29 January 1586), died young.; Ferdinand II, Holy Roman Emperor (9 July 1578 – 15 February 1637), married with issue.; Archduke Charles (17 July 1579 - 17 May 1580), died in infancy.; Archduchess Gregoria Maximiliana of Austria (22 May 1581 – 20 September 1597), died umarried.; Archduchess Eleanor of Austria (25 September 1582 – 28 January 1620), never married.; Archduke Maximilian Ernest of Austria (17 November 1583 – 18 February 1616), never married.; Margaret of Austria, Queen of Spain (25 December 1584 – 3 October 1611), married with issue.; Leopold V, Archduke of Austria (9 October 1586 – 13 September 1632), married with issue.; Constance of Austria, Queen of Poland (24 December 1588 – 10 July 1631), married with issue.; Archduchess Maria Maddalena of Austria (7 October 1589 – 1 November 1631), married with issue.; Charles of Austria, Bishop of Wroclaw (7 August 1590 – 28 December 1624), no issue.
	Archduchess Ursula	24 July 1541	30 April 1543	Died in childhood.
	Archduchess Helena of Austria	7 January 1543	5 March 1574	A nun, never married.
	Joanna of Austria, Grand Duchess of Tuscany	24 January 1547	10 April 1578	Married 1565 Francesco I de' Medici and had issue.: Eleanor de' Medici (28 February 1567 – 9 September 1611), married with issue.; Romola de' Medici (20 November 1568 – 2 December 1568), died in infancy.; Anna de' Medici (31 December 1569 – 19 February 1584), died unmarried.; Isabella de' Medici (30 September 1571 – 8 August 1572), died in infancy.; Lucrezia de' Medici (7 November 1572 – 14 August 1574), died in infancy.; Maria de' Medici, Queen of France (26 April 1575 – 3 July 1642), married with issue.; Filippo de' Medici (20 May 1577 – 29 March 1582), died in childhood.

=== Children of John II of Portugal and Catherine of Austria ===
John III, son of Manuel I of Portugal and Maria of Aragon married Catherine of Austria, daughter of Philip the Handsome and Joanna I in 1525. They were first cousins.

Image	Name	Birth	Death	Family
	Afonso, Hereditary Prince of Portugal	24 February 1526	12 April 1526	Died in infancy.
	Maria Manuela, Princess of Portugal	15 October 1527	12 July 1545	Married 1543 Philip II of Spain with issue (see Children of Charles V, Holy Roman Emperor).
	Infanta Isabel	28 April 1529	22 May 1530	Died in infancy.
	Infanta Beatriz	15 February 1530	16 March 1530	Died in infancy.
	Manuel, Hereditary Prince of Portugal	1 November 1531	14 April 1537	Died in childhood.
	Philip, Hereditary Prince of Portugal	25 March 1533	29 April 1539	Died in childhood.
	Infante Denis	6 April 1535	1 January 1537	Died in childhood.
	João Manuel, Prince of Portugal	3 June 1537	2 January 1554	Married 1552 Joanna of Austria, Princess of Portugal, his first cousin. Had issue. (see Children of Charles V, Holy Roman Emperor)
	Infante Antonio	9 March 1539	20 January 1540	Died in infancy.

=== Children of Beatrice of Portugal, Duchess of Savoy ===
Beatrice of Portugal married Charles III, Duke of Savoy in 1521. Together they had nine children, only one of whom would survive to adulthood.

Image	Name	Birth	Death	Family
	Adriano Giordano Amadeo, Prince of Piedmont	19 November 1522	10 January 1523	Died in infancy.
	Ludovico, Prince of Piedmont	4 December 1523	25 November 1536	Died in childhood.
	Emmanuel Philibert, Duke of Savoy	8 July 1528	30 August 1580	Married 1559 Margaret of Valois, Duchess of Berry and had issue.: Charles Emmanuel I, Duke of Savoy (12 January 1562 – 26 July 1630), married with issue.
	Caterina	25 November 1529	May 1536	Died in childhood.
	Maria	12 June 1530	1531	Died in infancy.
	Isabella	May 1532	24 September 1533	Died in infancy.
	Emanuele	May 1533	May 1533	Died in infancy.
	Emanuele	May 1534	May 1534	Died in infancy.
	Gianmaria	3 December 1537	8 January 1538	Died in infancy.

=== Children of Duarte, Duke of Guimarães ===
Duarte, Duke of Guimarães married Isabel of Braganza in 1537.

Image	Name	Birth	Death	Family
	Maria of Portugal, Hereditary Princess of Parma	12 August 1538	9 July 1577	Married 1565 Alexander Farnese, Duke of Parma and had issue.: Ranuccio I Farnese (28 March 1569 – 5 March 1622), married with issue.; Margherita Farnese (7 November 1567 – 13 April 1643), married without issue.; Odoardo Farnese (6 December 1573 – 21 February 1626), a cardinal.
	Catarina of Portugal, Duchess of Braganza	18 January 1540	15 November 1614	Married 1563 João I, Duke of Braganza with issue.: Maria (27 January 1565 – 30 April 1592); Serafina (20 May 1566 – 6 January 1604), married with issue.; Teodósio II, Duke of Braganza (28 April 1568 – 29 November 1630), married with issue.; Duarte (21 September 1569 – 27 May 1627); Alexandre (17 September 1570 – 11 September 1608), Archbishop of Évora; Cherubina (11 March 1572 – 11 March 1580); Angélica (8 June 1573 – 9 October 1576); Isabel (13 November 1578 – 12 January 1582); Filipe (17 November 1581 – 27 September 1608)
	Infante Duarte, 5th Duke of Guimarães	March 1541	28 November 1576	Died unmarried without issue.

== See also ==
- Descendants of Manuel I of Portugal - descendants of contemporary ruler
