= Catherine of Habsburg =

Catherine of Habsburg or Catherine of Austria may refer to:

- Catherine of Habsburg (1256–1282), daughter of Rudolf I of Germany and wife of Otto III, Duke of Bavaria
- Catherine of Austria, Duchess of Calabria (1295–1323), daughter of Albert I, Duke of Austria, and wife of Charles, Duke of Calabria
- Catherine of Austria, Lady of Coucy (1320–1349), daughter of Leopold I, Duke of Austria, and wife of Enguerrand VI, Lord of Coucy
- Catherine of Austria (1420–1493), daughter of Ernest, Duke of Austria, and wife of Charles I, Margrave of Baden-Baden
- Catherine of Austria, Queen of Portugal (1507–1578), daughter of Philip I and Joanna of Castile, wife of King John III of Portugal
- Catherine of Austria, Queen of Poland (1533–1572), daughter of Ferdinand I, Holy Roman Emperor, and wife of King Sigismund II Augustus of Poland
- Infanta Catherine Michelle of Spain (1567–1597), daughter of Philip II of Spain and wife of Charles Emmanuel I, Duke of Savoy
- Archduchess Catherine Renata of Austria (1576–1599), daughter of Charles II, Archduke of Austria

== See also ==
- Catherine of Bohemia (1342–1395), wife of Rudolf IV, Duke of Austria
- Catherine of Saxony, Archduchess of Austria (1468–1524), wife of Sigismund, Archduke of Austria
