= Eleanor of Austria (disambiguation) =

Eleanor of Austria may refer to:

- Archduchesses of Austria by birth:
  - Eleanor of Austria (1498–1558), Queen Consort of Portugal and France, daughter of Philip the Handsome and Joanna of Castile
  - Archduchess Eleanor of Austria, Duchess of Mantua (1534–1594), daughter of Emperor Ferdinand I
  - Archduchess Eleanor of Austria (1582–1620), daughter of Archduke Charles II
  - Eleanor of Austria, Queen of Poland (1653–1697), daughter of Emperor Ferdinand III
  - Eleonore von Habsburg (born 1994), granddaughter of Otto von Habsburg, Crown Prince of Austria
- Archduchesses of Austria by marriage:
  - Eleanor of Scotland (1433–1480), wife of Sigismund, Archduke of Austria
  - Eleanor of Portugal, Holy Roman Empress (1434–1467), wife of Emperor Frederick III
  - Eleonor Gonzaga (1598–1655), wife of Emperor Ferdinand II
  - Eleanor Gonzaga (1630–1686), wife of Emperor Ferdinand III
