= Archduchess Gregoria Maximiliana of Austria =

Austrian archduchess

Gregoria Maximiliana of Austria
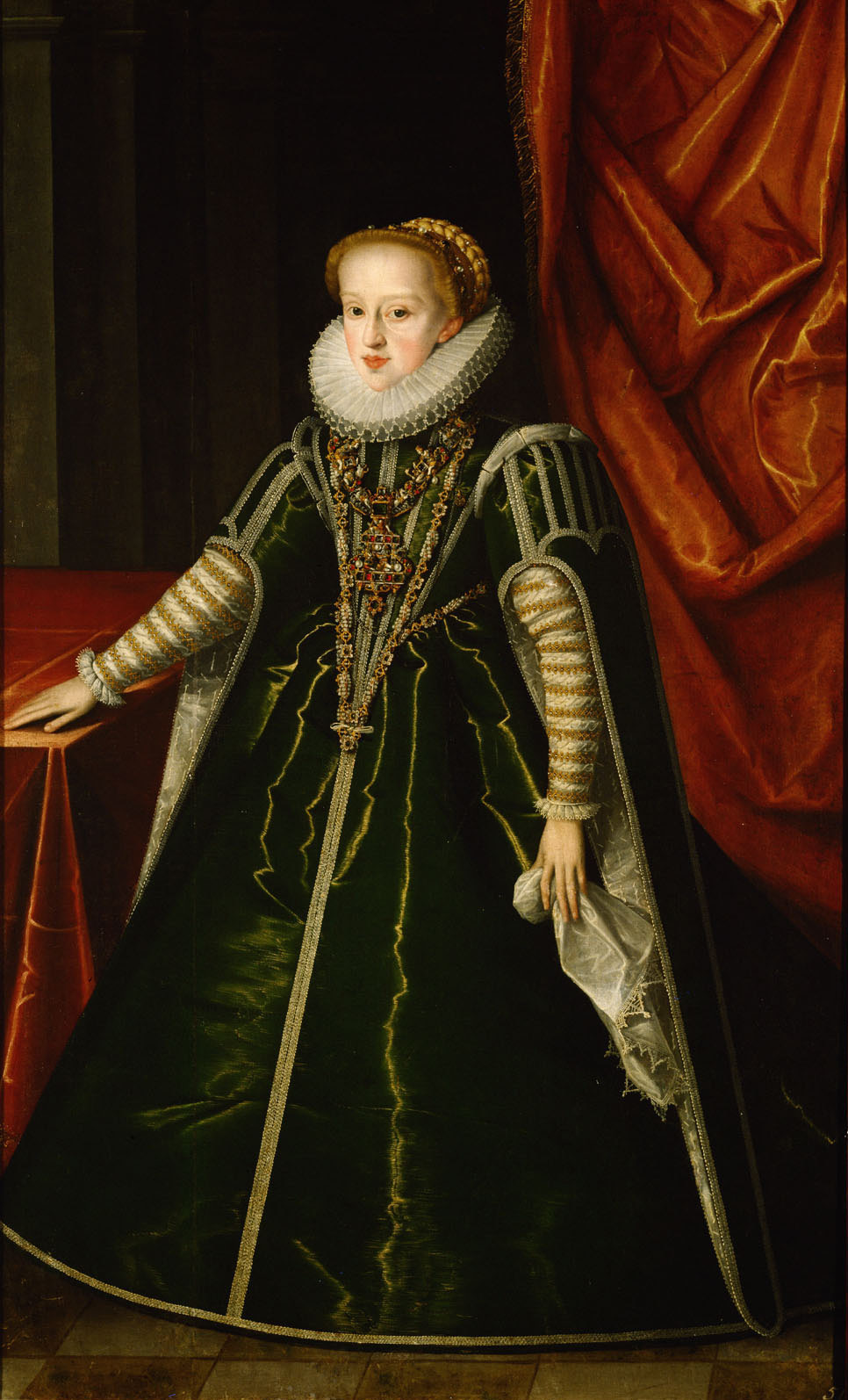
- Portrait by Jakob de Monte, c. 1591-93
- Born: 22 May 1581; Graz, Duchy of Styria, Holy Roman Empire
- Died: 20 September 1597 (aged 16); Graz, Duchy of Styria, Holy Roman Empire
- Burial: Seckau Abbey
- House: Habsburg
- Father: Charles II, Archduke of Austria
- Mother: Maria Anna of Bavaria

Archduchess Gregoria Maximiliana of Austria (22 May 1581 – 20 September 1597) was a member of the House of Habsburg.

She was the daughter of Charles II, Archduke of Austria, the son of Ferdinand I, Holy Roman Emperor, and Maria Anna of Bavaria. Her elder brother Archduke Ferdinand, succeeded as Holy Roman Emperor in 1619.

== Life ==
Born in Graz, her godparents were Pope Gregory XIII and her maternal aunt, Maximiliana Maria of Bavaria. Named after both, Gregoria Maximiliana was described as extremely pious and had the closest relationship to her mother among her siblings.

In addition to the Habsburg inferior lip, Gregoria Maximiliana suffered from a deformed shoulder and a scarred face.

In 1596, the Admiral of Aragon Francisco de Mendoza visited Graz and delivered to the Spanish court portraits of Gregoria Maximiliana and her two younger sisters in marriageable age, Eleanor and Margaret. Shortly after, Gregoria Maximiliana was betrothed to the Prince of Asturias, the future King Philip III of Spain. Although the Prince, after seeing the portraits preferred Margaret, his father King Philip II chose Gregoria Maximiliana as his bride, mainly because she was the older sister.

On 17 September 1597, the Prince of Asturias made a visit to the archducal court in Graz. At this time, Gregoria Maximiliana was seriously ill and she compared her suffering to the prisoners of the Turkish sultan. Three days later, she died aged sixteen, and was in buried in Seckau Abbey. Gregoria Maximiliana's fiancé married her sister Margaret in 1599.

== Ancestors ==
Ancestors of Archduchess Gregoria Maximiliana of Austria

16. Maximilian I, Holy Roman Emperor
8. Philip I of Castile (= 28)
17. Mary of Burgundy
4. Ferdinand I, Holy Roman Emperor (=14)
18. Ferdinand II of Aragon
9. Joanna of Castile (= 29)
19. Isabella I of Castile
2. Charles II of Austria
20. Casimir IV Jagiellon
10. Vladislas II of Bohemia and Hungary (= 30)
21. Elisabeth of Austria
5. Anna of Bohemia and Hungary (=15)
22. Gaston de Foix, Count of Candale
11. Anna of Foix-Candale (= 31)
23. Catherine of Foix
1. Archduchess Gregoria Maximiliana of Austria
24. Albert IV, Duke of Bavaria
12. William IV, Duke of Bavaria
25. Kunigunde of Austria
6. Albert V, Duke of Bavaria
26. Philip I, Margrave of Baden
13. Marie of Baden-Sponheim
27. Elisabeth of the Palatinate
3. Maria Anna of Bavaria
28. Philip I of Castile (= 8)
14. Ferdinand I, Holy Roman Emperor (= 4)
29. Joanna of Castile (= 9)
7. Anna of Austria
30. Vladislas II of Bohemia and Hungary (= 10)
15. Anna of Bohemia and Hungary (= 5)
31. Anna of Foix-Candale (= 11)
