= Archduke Maximilian Ernest of Austria =

Austrian prince

Maximilian Ernest of Austria
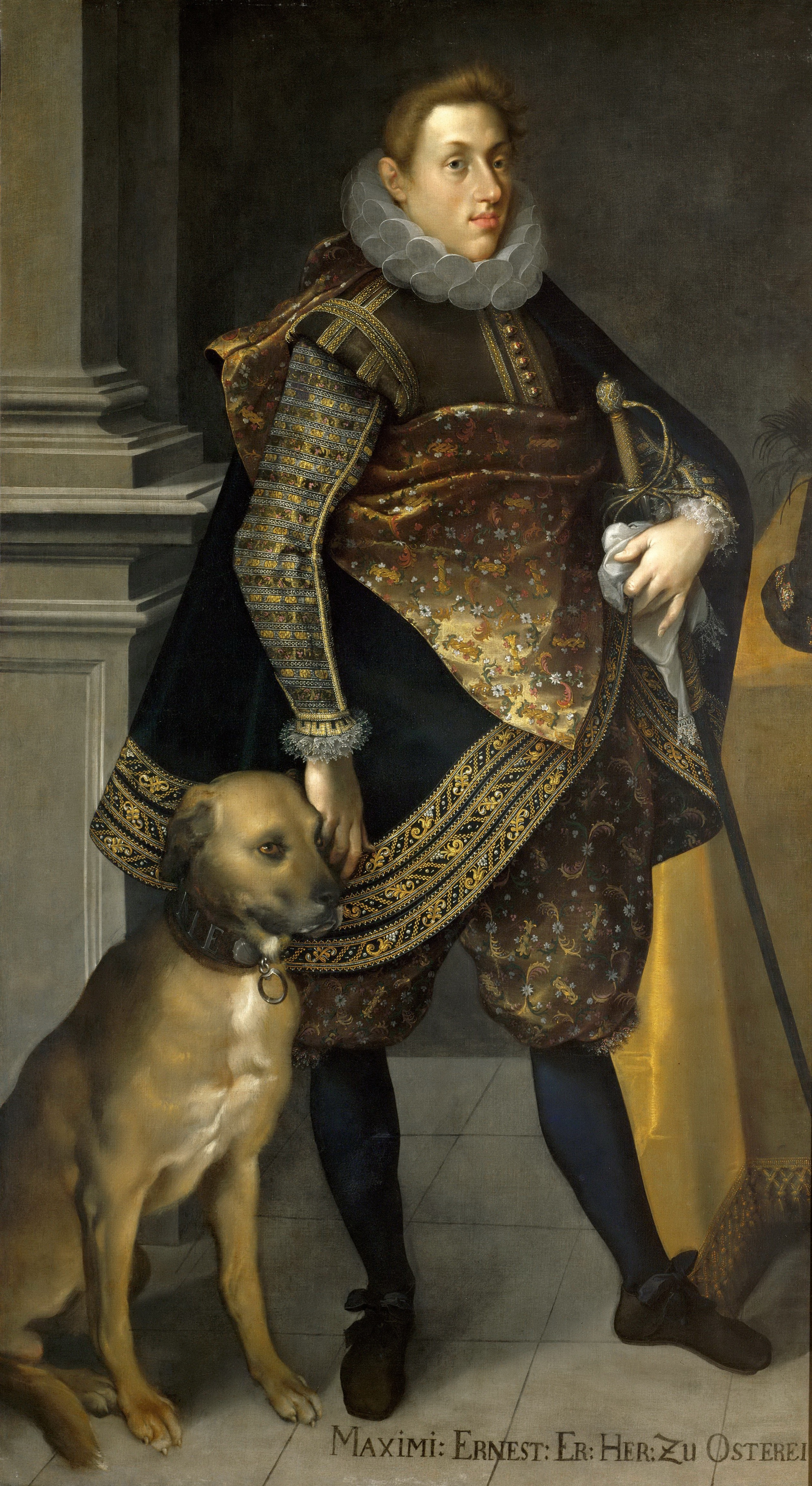
- Archduke Maximilian Ernest with a hunting dog, by Joseph Heintz the Elder, c. 1604
- Born: November 17, 1583; Graz, Duchy of Styria
- Died: February 18, 1616 (aged 32); Archduchy of Austria
- Burial: Seckau Abbey
- House: Habsburg
- Father: Charles II, Archduke of Austria
- Mother: Maria Anna of Bavaria

Maximilian Ernest of Austria (17 November 1583 – 18 February 1616), was an Austrian prince member of the House of Habsburg and by birth Archduke of Austria.

He was the son of Charles II, Archduke of Austria, in turn, the son of Emperor Ferdinand I, and Maria Anna of Bavaria. His elder brother Archduke Ferdinand, succeeded as Holy Roman Emperor in 1619.

== Life ==
Born in Graz, little is known about his first years of life. His first notable presence was in 1592, when Maximilian Ernest and his mother accompanied his older sister Anna to marry King Sigismund III of Poland.

Together with his brother Ferdinand and his cousins Maximilian III and Matthias, Maximilian Ernest signed a document dated 25 April 1606 in Vienna, under which his cousin, Emperor Rudolf II, was declared incapable of governing because of his mental illness and Matthias could assume the headship of the Habsburg territories as regent.

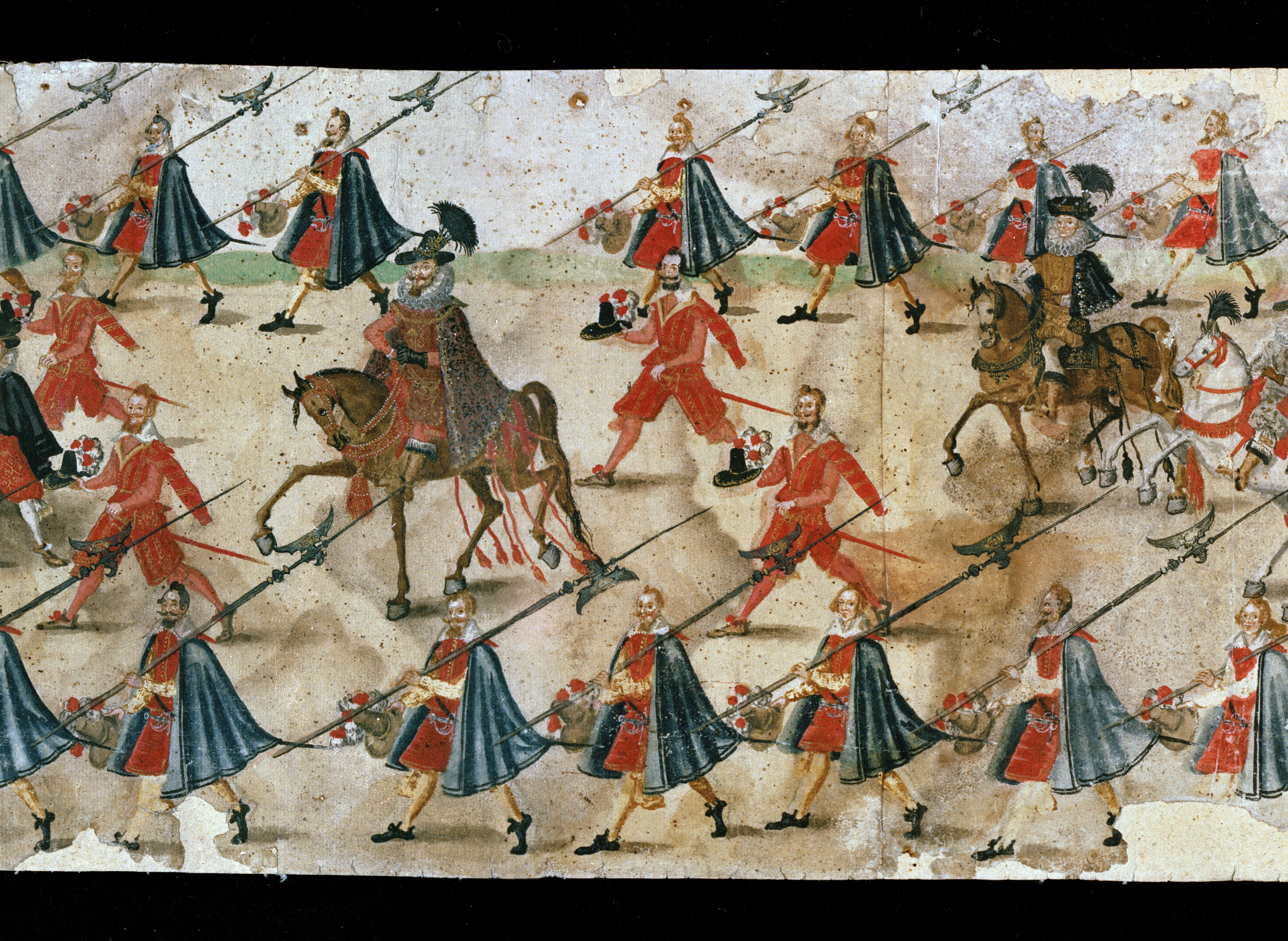
Maximilian riding behind King Sigismund III, at his sisters Constance entry in Krakow 1605.

His cousin Maximilian III, called the German Grand Master (der Deutschmeister), allowed Maximiliam Ernest to join the Teutonic Knights in 1615, and one year later, in 1616, he appointed him Landkomtur of the Bailiwick of Austria. Already named Coadjutor of the Teutonic Order was determined that Maximilian Ernest would succeed his cousin in the office of Grand Master, but he died unexpectedly aged thirty-two, unmarried and childless (however he left an illegitimate son, Don Carlos d'Austria, who died in 1638). He was buried in the Seckau Abbey.

== Ancestors ==
Ancestors of Archduke Maximilian Ernest of Austria

8. Philip I of Castile
4. Ferdinand I, Holy Roman Emperor
9. Joanna I of Castile
2. Charles II, Archduke of Austria
10. Vladislas II of Bohemia and Hungary
5. Anne of Bohemia and Hungary
11. Anne of Foix-Candale
1. Archduke Maximilian Ernest of Austria
12. William IV, Duke of Bavaria
6. Albert V, Duke of Bavaria
13. Marie of Baden-Sponheim
3. Maria Anna of Bavaria
14. Ferdinand I, Holy Roman Emperor (= 4)
7. Anna of Austria
15. Anne of Bohemia and Hungary (= 5)

== Male-line family tree ==
House of Habsburg

Original line
Albert; Count of Habsburg c. 1188–1239
Rudolf I of Germany c. 1218–1291
Albert I of Germany; 1255–1308	Hartmann; 1263–1281	Rudolf II; Duke of Austria; 1270–1290
Rudolf I of Bohemia; 1281–1307	Frederick the Fair c. 1289–1330	Leopold I Duke of Austria; 1290–1326	Albert II; Duke of Austria; 1298–1358	Henry the Friendly; 1299–1327	Otto; Duke of Austria; 1301–1339	John; Parricida c. 1290–1312/1313
Albertinian line	Leopoldian line
Rudolf IV; Duke of Austria; 1339–1365	Frederick III; 1347–1362	Albert III; Duke of Austria; 1349–1395	Leopold III; Duke of Austria; 1351–1386	Frederick II; Duke of Austria; 1327–1344	Leopold II; Duke of Austria; 1328–1344
Albert IV; Duke of Austria; 1377–1404	William; Duke of Austria c. 1370–1406	Leopold IV; Duke of Austria; 1371–1411	Ernest; Duke of Austria; 1377–1424	Frederick IV; Duke of Austria; 1382–1439
Albert II of Germany; 1397–1439	Frederick III; HRE; 1415–1493	Albert VI; Archduke of Austria; 1418–1463	Sigismund; Archduke of Austria; 1427–1496
Ladislaus the Posthumous; 1440–1457	Maximilian I HRE; 1459–1519
Philip I of Castile; 1478–1506
Spanish / Iberian line	Austrian / HRE line
Charles V HRE; 1500–1558	Ferdinand I HRE; 1503–1564
Philip II of Spain; 1527–1598	Maximilian II; HRE; 1527–1576	Ferdinand II; Archduke of Austria; 1529–1595	Charles II; Archduke of Austria; 1540–1590
Carlos; Prince of Asturias; 1545–1568	Philip III of Spain; 1578–1621	Rudolf II; HRE; 1552–1612	Ernest of Austria; 1553–1595	Matthias; HRE; 1557–1619	Maximilian III; Archduke of Austria; 1558–1618	Albert VII; Archduke of Austria; 1559–1621	Wenceslaus; Archduke of Austria; 1561–1578	Andrew; Margrave of Burgau; 1558–1600	Charles; Margrave of Burgau; 1560–1618	Ferdinand II; HRE; 1578–1637	Maximilian Ernest of Austria; 1583–1616	Leopold V Archduke of Austria; 1586–1632	Charles of Austria; 1590–1624
Philip IV of Spain; 1605–1665	Charles of Austria; 1607–1632	Ferdinand of Austria; 1609–1641	John-Charles of Austria; 1605–1619	Ferdinand III; HRE; 1608–1657	Leopold Wilhelm of Austria; 1614–1662	Ferdinand Charles; Archduke of Austria; 1628–1662	Sigismund Francis; Archduke of Austria; 1630–1665
Balthasar Charles; Prince of Asturias; 1629–1646	Charles II of Spain; 1661–1700	Ferdinand IV; King of the Romans; 1633–1654	Leopold I HRE; 1640–1705	Charles Joseph of Austria; 1649–1664
Joseph I HRE; 1678–1711	Charles VI; HRE; 1685–1740
