= Charles of Austria, Bishop of Breslau =

Austrian archduke

Archduke Charles of Austria
- Prince-Bishop of Breslau
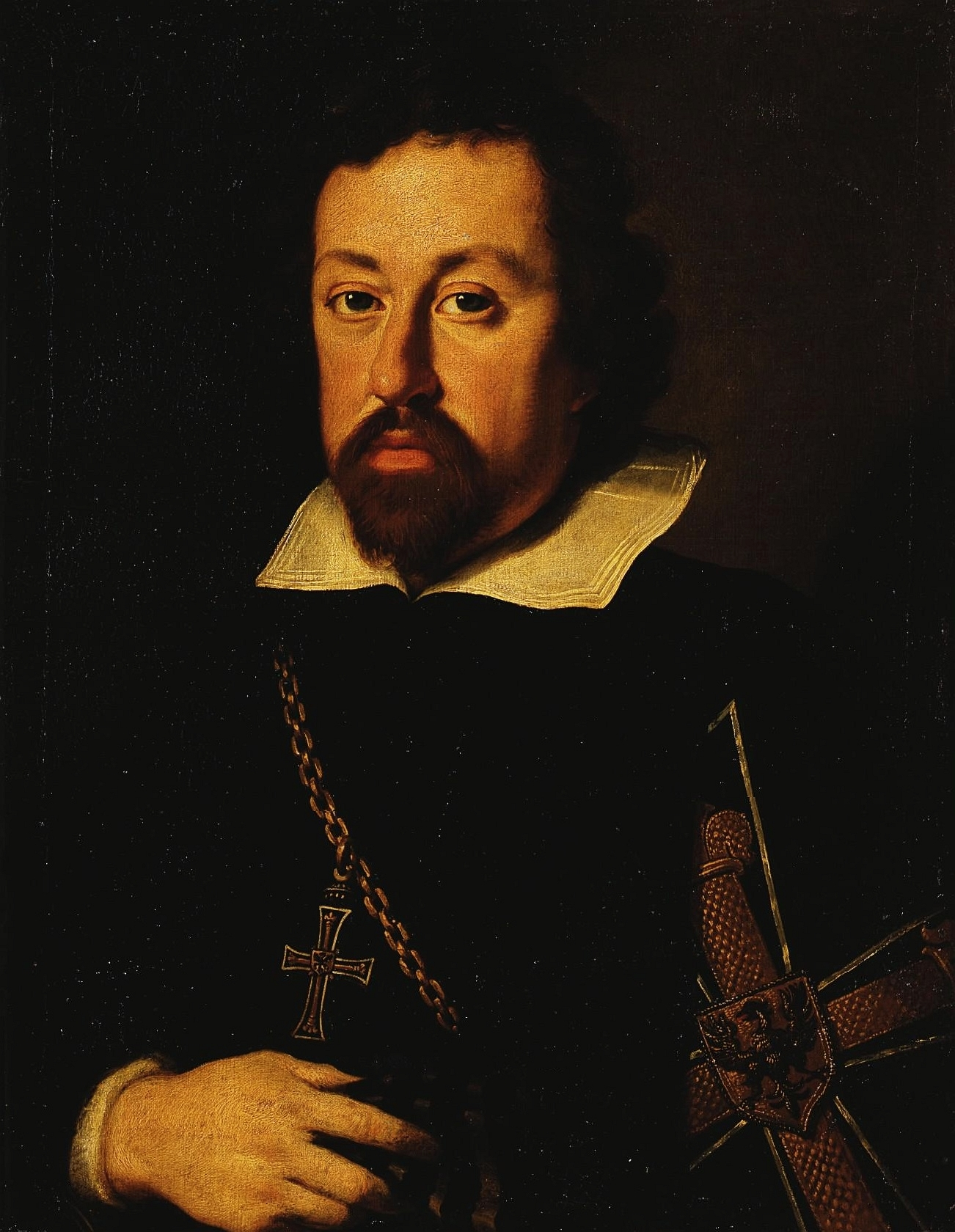
- Portrait by Justus Sustermans
- Native name: Karl von Österreich
- Diocese: Roman Catholic Diocese of Breslau
- Appointed: 1608
- Term ended: 1624
- Predecessor: Johann VI of Sitsch
- Successor: Karol Ferdynand Vasa
- Other posts: Prince-Bishop of Brixen; Grand Master of the Teutonic Order

Personal details
- Born: August 7, 1590 Graz, Styria, Holy Roman Empire
- Died: December 28, 1624 (aged 34) Madrid, Spain
- Buried: El Escorial
- Denomination: Roman Catholic
- Residence: Neisse (Nysa)
- Parents: Charles II, Archduke of Austria; Maria Anna of Bavaria

Charles of Austria (German: Karl von Österreich; 7 August 1590 – 28 December 1624), nicknamed the Posthumous, a member of the Imperial House of Habsburg, was Prince-Bishop of Breslau (Wrocław) from 1608, Prince-Bishop of Brixen from 1613, and Grand Master of the Teutonic Order from 1618 until his death. In 1621 he also received the Bohemian County of Kladsko as a fief from the hands of his brother, Emperor Ferdinand II.

== Life ==
Born in Graz, Styria, Charles was the youngest son of Archduke Charles II of Austria (1540–1590), ruling over the Inner Austrian estates of the Habsburg monarchy, and his consort Maria Anna (1551–1608), daughter of the Wittelsbach duke Albert V of Bavaria. Born less than a month after his father's death, he was nicknamed "Charles the Posthumous" (Karl der Posthume). As the last of 15 siblings, Charles, like his brother Leopold V was destined for an ecclesiastical career.

In 1602 he was appointed to a canonry of Salzburg Cathedral and in 1605 to a canonry of Passau. Further canonries in Trent and Brixen followed in 1606, and in Cologne Cathedral in 1618. These were for the most part absentee appointments that provided him with an income from ecclesiastical revenues. On 7 July 1608, at the age of 17, he was elected Prince-bishop at Breslau; he entered the city on December 14. In 1613 Charles also became Prince-Bishop of Brixen, however, he left the governance of the diocese to an administrator as he had chosen Neisse (Nysa) for his permanent residence. He did not receive holy orders until 1615, due to his young age. In 1619 he succeeded his cousin Archduke Maximilian III of Austria as Grand Master (Hochmeister) of the Teutonic Knights.

Charles was a staunch Catholic. Upon his appointment as Breslau prince-bishop, he strongly protested against the 1609 Letter of Majesty, issued by his cousin Emperor Rudolf II to treat all religions equally in the Bohemian crown land of Silesia, and failed to succeed as a Silesian Landeshauptmann governor. When after the outbreak of the Thirty Years' War in 1618 the Protestant Silesian estates rebelled and acknowledged Frederick V of the Palatinate as king, the prince-bishop fled to the Polish court of King Sigismund III Vasa and later moved to Brixen. After the 1620 Battle of White Mountain he returned to forcefully reintroduce Catholicism in his Duchy of Nysa. He founded a Jesuit college there, the Carolinum, in 1622. After he had received the Bohemian County of Kladsko from Emperor Ferdinand II in 1621, he had the area likewise occupied by Imperial troops and forcefully reverted to Catholicism.

In 1624 he travelled to Madrid, at the request of his nephew King Philip IV of Spain, who planned to appoint him Viceroy of Portugal. However, he fell seriously ill and died in late December before taking up his post. His mortal remains were buried in the Royal Site of San Lorenzo de El Escorial, while his heart was transferred to the newly erected St Mary's Jesuit Church in Nysa.

== Ancestors ==
Ancestors of Charles of Austria, Bishop of Breslau

16. Maximilian I, Holy Roman Emperor
8. Philip I of Castile (= 28)
17. Mary of Burgundy
4. Ferdinand I, Holy Roman Emperor (=14)
18. Ferdinand II of Aragon
9. Joanna of Castile (= 29)
19. Isabella I of Castile
2. Charles II, Archduke of Austria
20. Casimir IV Jagiellon
10. Vladislas II of Bohemia and Hungary (= 30)
21. Elisabeth of Austria
5. Anna of Bohemia and Hungary (=15)
22. Gaston de Foix, Count of Candale
11. Anna of Foix-Candale (= 31)
23. Catherine of Foix
1. Charles of Austria, Bishop of Wroclaw
24. Albert IV, Duke of Bavaria
12. William IV, Duke of Bavaria
25. Kunigunde of Austria
6. Albert V, Duke of Bavaria
26. Philip I, Margrave of Baden
13. Marie of Baden-Sponheim
27. Elisabeth of the Palatinate
3. Maria Anna of Bavaria
28. Philip I of Castile (= 8)
14. Ferdinand I, Holy Roman Emperor (= 4)
29. Joanna of Castile (= 9)
7. Anna of Austria
30. Vladislas II of Bohemia and Hungary (= 10)
15. Anna of Bohemia and Hungary (= 5)
31. Anna of Foix-Candale (= 11)

== Male-line family tree ==
House of Habsburg

Original line
Albert; Count of Habsburg c. 1188–1239
Rudolf I of Germany c. 1218–1291
Albert I of Germany; 1255–1308	Hartmann; 1263–1281	Rudolf II; Duke of Austria; 1270–1290
Rudolf I of Bohemia; 1281–1307	Frederick the Fair c. 1289–1330	Leopold I Duke of Austria; 1290–1326	Albert II; Duke of Austria; 1298–1358	Henry the Friendly; 1299–1327	Otto; Duke of Austria; 1301–1339	John; Parricida c. 1290–1312/1313
Albertinian line	Leopoldian line
Rudolf IV; Duke of Austria; 1339–1365	Frederick III; 1347–1362	Albert III; Duke of Austria; 1349–1395	Leopold III; Duke of Austria; 1351–1386	Frederick II; Duke of Austria; 1327–1344	Leopold II; Duke of Austria; 1328–1344
Albert IV; Duke of Austria; 1377–1404	William; Duke of Austria c. 1370–1406	Leopold IV; Duke of Austria; 1371–1411	Ernest; Duke of Austria; 1377–1424	Frederick IV; Duke of Austria; 1382–1439
Albert II of Germany; 1397–1439	Frederick III; HRE; 1415–1493	Albert VI; Archduke of Austria; 1418–1463	Sigismund; Archduke of Austria; 1427–1496
Ladislaus the Posthumous; 1440–1457	Maximilian I HRE; 1459–1519
Philip I of Castile; 1478–1506
Spanish / Iberian line	Austrian / HRE line
Charles V HRE; 1500–1558	Ferdinand I HRE; 1503–1564
Philip II of Spain; 1527–1598	Maximilian II; HRE; 1527–1576	Ferdinand II; Archduke of Austria; 1529–1595	Charles II; Archduke of Austria; 1540–1590
Carlos; Prince of Asturias; 1545–1568	Philip III of Spain; 1578–1621	Rudolf II; HRE; 1552–1612	Ernest of Austria; 1553–1595	Matthias; HRE; 1557–1619	Maximilian III; Archduke of Austria; 1558–1618	Albert VII; Archduke of Austria; 1559–1621	Wenceslaus; Archduke of Austria; 1561–1578	Andrew; Margrave of Burgau; 1558–1600	Charles; Margrave of Burgau; 1560–1618	Ferdinand II; HRE; 1578–1637	Maximilian Ernest of Austria; 1583–1616	Leopold V Archduke of Austria; 1586–1632	Charles of Austria; 1590–1624
Philip IV of Spain; 1605–1665	Charles of Austria; 1607–1632	Ferdinand of Austria; 1609–1641	John-Charles of Austria; 1605–1619	Ferdinand III; HRE; 1608–1657	Leopold Wilhelm of Austria; 1614–1662	Ferdinand Charles; Archduke of Austria; 1628–1662	Sigismund Francis; Archduke of Austria; 1630–1665
Balthasar Charles; Prince of Asturias; 1629–1646	Charles II of Spain; 1661–1700	Ferdinand IV; King of the Romans; 1633–1654	Leopold I HRE; 1640–1705	Charles Joseph of Austria; 1649–1664
Joseph I HRE; 1678–1711	Charles VI; HRE; 1685–1740
Lorraine
Maria Theresa; HRE; 1740–1780	Francis I HRE; 1745–1765
Habsburg-Lorraine
Joseph II; HRE; 1765–1790	Leopold II; HRE; 1790–1792
Francis II; HRE; 1792–1806
