= Archduchess Catherine Renata of Austria =

Catherine Renata of Austria
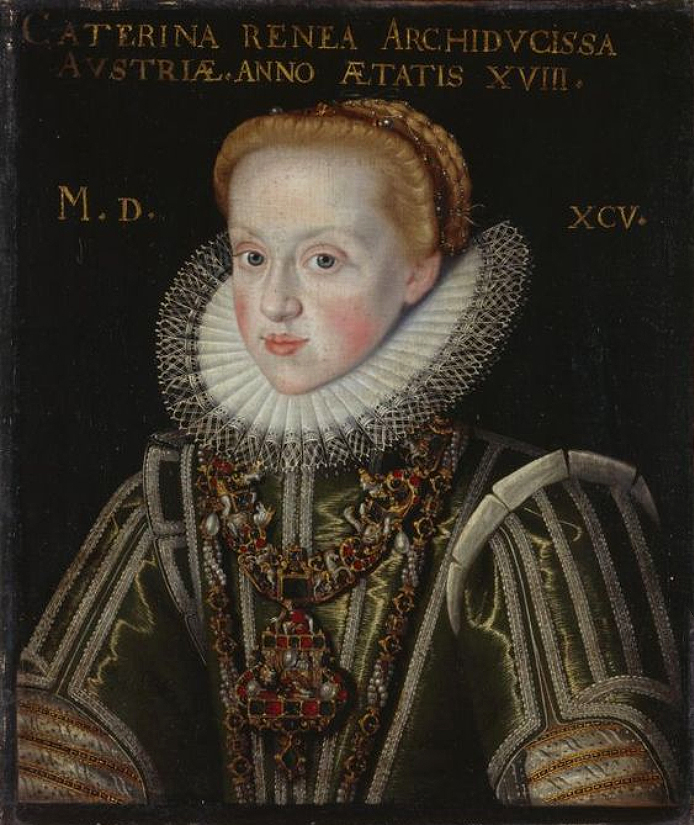
- Portrait c.1595
- Born: 4 January 1576; Graz, Duchy of Styria, Holy Roman Empire
- Died: 29 June 1599 (aged 23); Seckau Abbey, Duchy of Styria, Holy Roman Empire
- House: House of Habsburg
- Father: Charles II, Archduke of Austria
- Mother: Maria Anna of Bavaria

Archduchess Catherine Renata of Austria (4 January 1576 – 29 June 1599) was a member of the House of Habsburg.

== Early life ==
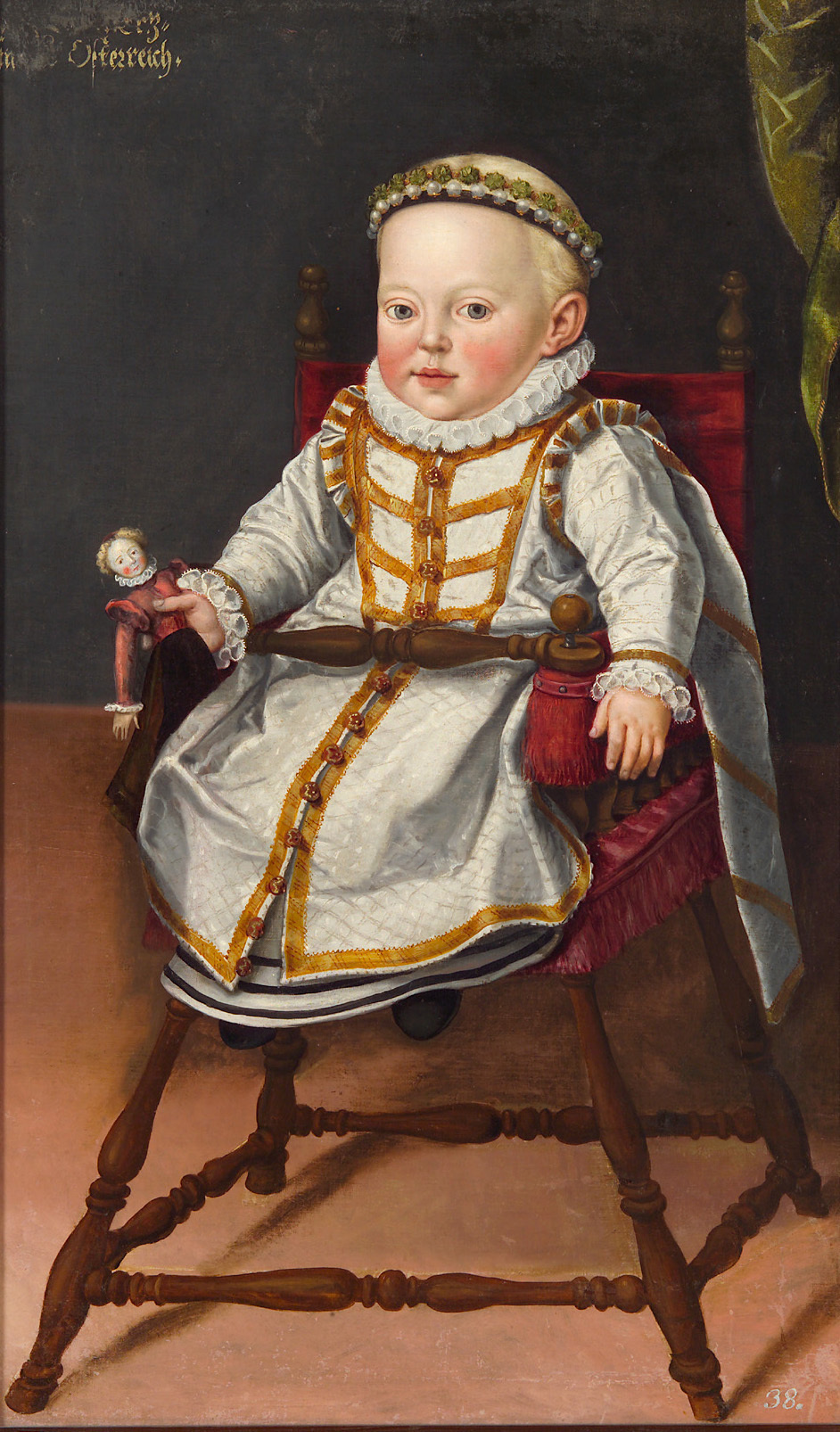
Portrait of Catherine Renata by Cornelis Vermeyen, c. 1577

She was the daughter of Charles II, Archduke of Austria, the son of Ferdinand I, Holy Roman Emperor, and his wife, Princess Maria Anna of Bavaria. Her younger brother Archduke Ferdinand succeeded Matthias as Holy Roman Emperor in 1619.

== Possible marriage and death ==
Born in Graz, Catherine Renata, like all her siblings, suffered from the famous Habsburg jaw. Negotiations for a marriage in 1599, between her and Ranuccio I Farnese, Duke of Parma ended when Catherine Renata suddenly died aged twenty-three. She was buried in the Seckau Abbey.
