= Maria Anna of Bavaria (born 1551) =

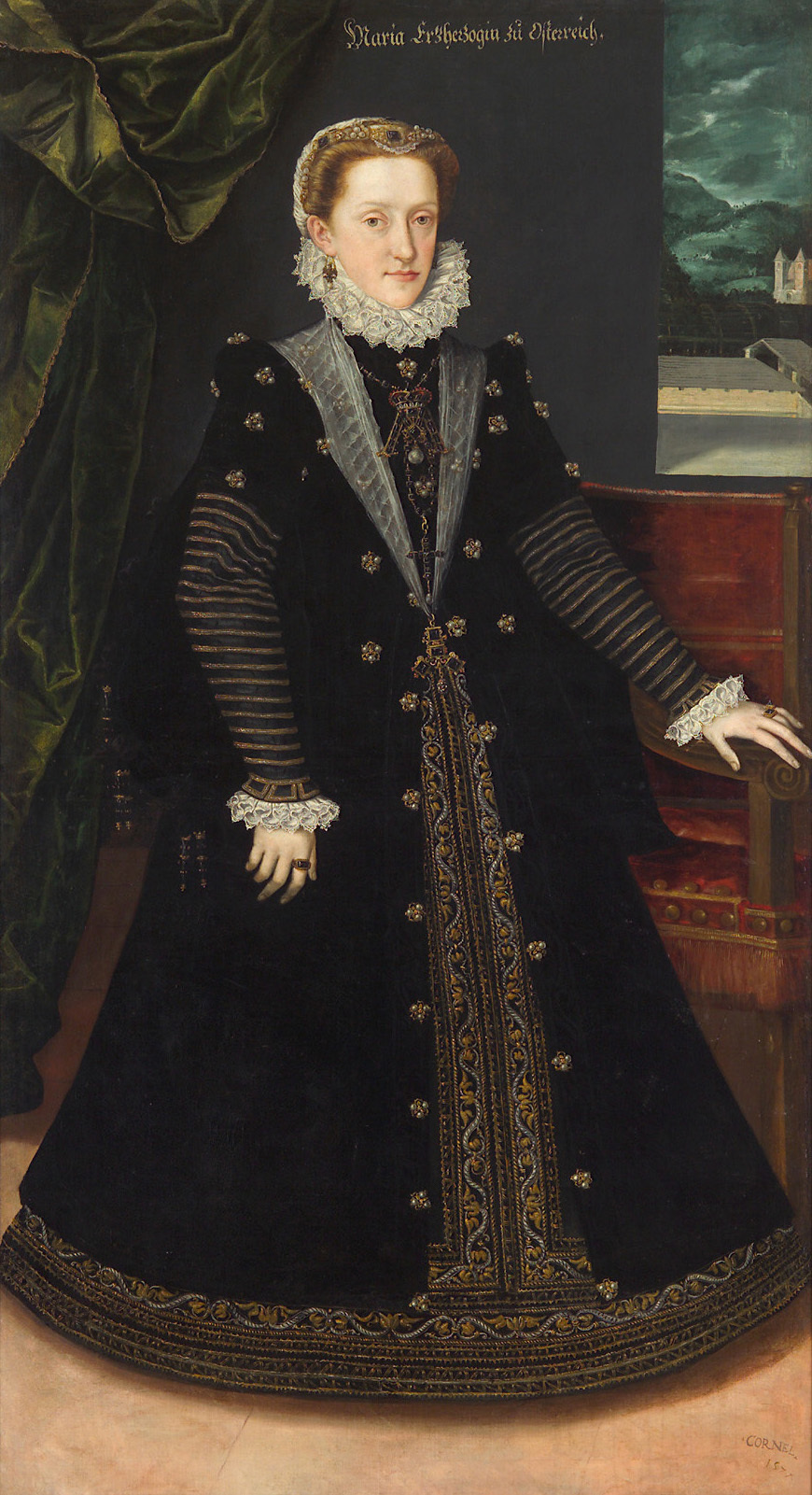
- Portrait by Cornelis Vermeyen, 1577

Archduchess consort of Inner Austria
- Tenure: 26 August 1571 – 10 July 1590
- Born: 21 March 1551; Munich, Duchy of Bavaria
- Died: 29 April 1608 (aged 57); Graz, Archduchy of Austria
- Spouse: Charles II, Archduke of Austria (m. 1571; died 1590)
- Issue: Anne, Queen of Poland; Maria Christina, Princess of Transylvania; Archduchess Catherine Renata; Ferdinand II, Holy Roman Emperor; Archduchess Gregoria Maximiliana; Archduchess Eleanor; Archduke Maximilian Ernest; Margaret, Queen of Spain; Leopold V, Archduke of Further Austria; Constance, Queen of Poland; Maria Magdalena, Grand Duchess of Tuscany; Charles, Bishop of Wroclaw
- House: Wittelsbach
- Father: Albert V, Duke of Bavaria
- Mother: Anna of Austria

Maria Anna of Bavaria (German: Maria Anna von Bayern) (21 March 1551, Munich – 29 April 1608, Graz) was a politically active Archduchess of Austria by her marriage to her uncle Archduke Charles II of Austria. She played an important role in the Counter-Reformation in Austria.

== Biography ==
Maria Anna was a daughter of Albert V, Duke of Bavaria and Anna of Austria. She was given an elementary education in Latin and religion but a high education in music, likely by Orlando di Lasso.

On 26 August 1571 in Vienna, the 20-year-old Maria Anna married her maternal uncle Charles II of Austria. The marriage was arranged to give Austria political support from Bavaria and Bavaria an agent in Vienna.

The relation between Maria Anna and Charles was described as good, and the couple had 15 children in just 18 years. Maria Anna was described as confident, ambitious and a great lover of pomp and power, but foremost a devout Catholic. She participated in affairs of state and successfully benefited a powerful counter reformation in the domains of her spouse. She continued her education in music, benefited the Jesuit school in Graz, and spent her time in worship and religious charity.

Maria Anna was widowed in 1590, but she continued to participate in politics as an advisor to her son and encouraged him to continue the Counter-Reformation and work against the Protestant clergy and nobility.

In 1608, she retired to the Nunnery of St Clare in Graz.

Her correspondence is partially preserved.

== Issue ==
Name	Picture	Birth	Death	Notes
Archduke Ferdinand		15 July 1572, Judenburg	3 August 1572, Judenburg	Died in infancy.
Archduchess Anna		16 August 1573, Graz	10 February 1598, Warsaw	Married on 31 May 1592 to Sigismund III Vasa, King of Poland, Grand Duke of Lithuania and King of Sweden.
Archduchess Maria Christina		10 November 1574, Graz	6 April 1621, Hall in Tirol, Tyrol	Married on 6 August 1595 to Sigismund Bathory, Prince of Transylvania; they divorced in 1599.
Archduchess Catherine Renata		4 January 1576, Graz	29 June 1599, Graz	Died unmarried.
Archduchess Elisabeth		13 March 1577, Graz	29 January 1586, Graz	Died in childhood.
Archduke Ferdinand		9 July 1578, Graz	15 February 1637, Vienna	Holy Roman Emperor as Ferdinand II in 1619.
Archduke Charles		17 July 1579, Graz	17 May 1580, Graz	Died in infancy.
Archduchess Gregoria Maximiliana		22 March 1581, Graz	20 September 1597, Graz	Died unmarried.
Archduchess Eleanor		25 September 1582, Graz	28 January 1620, Hall in Tirol, Tyrol	Died unmarried.
Archduke Maximilian Ernest		17 November 1583, Graz	18 February 1616, Graz	Teutonic Knight.
Archduchess Margaret		25 December 1584, Graz	3 October 1611, El Escorial	Married on 18 April 1599 to Philip III, King of Spain.
Archduke Leopold		9 October 1586, Graz	13 September 1632, Schwaz	Archduke of Further Austria and Count of Tirol under the name Leopold V.
Archduchess Constance		24 December 1588, Graz	10 July 1631, Warsaw	Married on 11 December 1605 to Sigismund III Vasa, King of Poland and Grand Duke of Lithuania (widower of her older sister).
Archduchess Maria Magdalena		7 October 1589, Graz	1 November 1631, Passau	Married on 19 October 1608 Cosimo II de' Medici, Grand Duke of Tuscany.
Archduke Charles		7 August 1590, Graz	28 December 1624, Madrid	Bishop of Wroclaw and Brixen (1608–24), Grand Master of the Teutonic Order (1618–24).

== Ancestry ==
Ancestors of Maria Anna of Bavaria (born 1551)

16. Albert III, Duke of Bavaria
8. Albert IV, Duke of Bavaria
17. Anna of Brunswick-Grubenhagen-Einbeck
4. William IV, Duke of Bavaria
18. Frederick III, Holy Roman Emperor
9. Kunigunde of Austria
19. Eleanor of Portugal
2. Albert V, Duke of Bavaria
20. Christopher I, Margrave of Baden-Baden
10. Philip I, Margrave of Baden-Sponheim
21. Ottilie von Katzenelnbogen
5. Marie of Baden-Sponheim
22. Philip, Elector Palatine
11. Elisabeth of the Palatinate
23. Margaret of Bavaria
1. Maria Anna of Bavaria
24. Maximilian I, Holy Roman Emperor
12. Philip I of Castile
25. Mary of Burgundy
6. Ferdinand I, Holy Roman Emperor
26. Ferdinand II of Aragon
13. Joanna of Castile
27. Isabella I of Castile
3. Archduchess Anna of Austria
28. Casimir IV Jagiellon
14. Vladislaus II of Bohemia and Hungary
29. Archduchess Elisabeth of Austria
7. Anna of Bohemia and Hungary
30. Gaston de Foix, Count of Candale
15. Anna of Foix-Candale
31. Infanta Catherine of Navarre

== Bibliography ==
- HAMANN, Brigitte, Die Habsburger: Ein Biografisches Lexicon (Munich: Piper, 1988).
- Parker, Geoffrey (1987). The Thirty Years' War. Military Heritage Press.
- SÁNCHEZ, Magdalena, (2000) A Woman's Influence: Archduchess Maria of Bavaria and the Spanish Habsburgs. In C. Kent, T.K. Wolber, C.M.K. Hewitt (Eds.) The lion and the eagle: interdisciplinary essays on German-Spanish relations over the centuries (pp. 91–107). New York: Berghahn Books.
