= Tadea della Penna =

Illegitimate daughter of Charles V, Holy Roman Emperor

- Born: 1523; Bologna, Italy
- Died: c. 1562 (aged 38–39); Rome, Italy
- Father: Charles V, Holy Roman Emperor
- Mother: Orsolina della Penna

Tadea della Penna (1523 – c. 1562) was an Italian noblewoman. She was an illegitimate daughter of Charles V, Holy Roman Emperor.

== Life ==
Tadea was born in Bologna in 1523, whilst her mother was travelling to Rome. She was the illegitimate daughter of Charles V, Holy Roman Emperor, and Orsolina della Penna, an Italian widow who was known as "the beauty of Perugia."

Tadea was taken to see Charles when he was in Bologna in 1530 and 1532-3.

She married Sinibaldo dei Coppeschi, a nobleman of Montefalco, when she was 13 years old. Whilst the Emperor did not recognise all of his illegitimate children, including Tadea, he did strive to keep their lives under his control. When he found out that the marriage had taken place, he wrote angrily to the groom's aunt, who had organised the wedding. Charles' biographer Kohler has suggested that it is likely that he had grander aspirations for his daughter's marriage, as with the marriage of Margaret of Parma, who was wed firstly to Alessandro de' Medici, Duke of Florence and secondly to Ottavio Farnese, Duke of Parma.

Tadea later became a nun and entered a convent near Perugia.

After her father's death, she wrote to her half-brother, Philip II of Spain, in 1560 and asked him to recognise her as the daughter of the late emperor and grant her a pension. Phillip had not been aware of her existence prior to her letter, but she explained that many local lay and religious people knew about her parentage. He is known to have responded to her letter, but a copy has not survived.

She died in about 1562 in Rome.
