= Archduchess Eleanor of Austria (1582–1620) =

Austrian archduchess

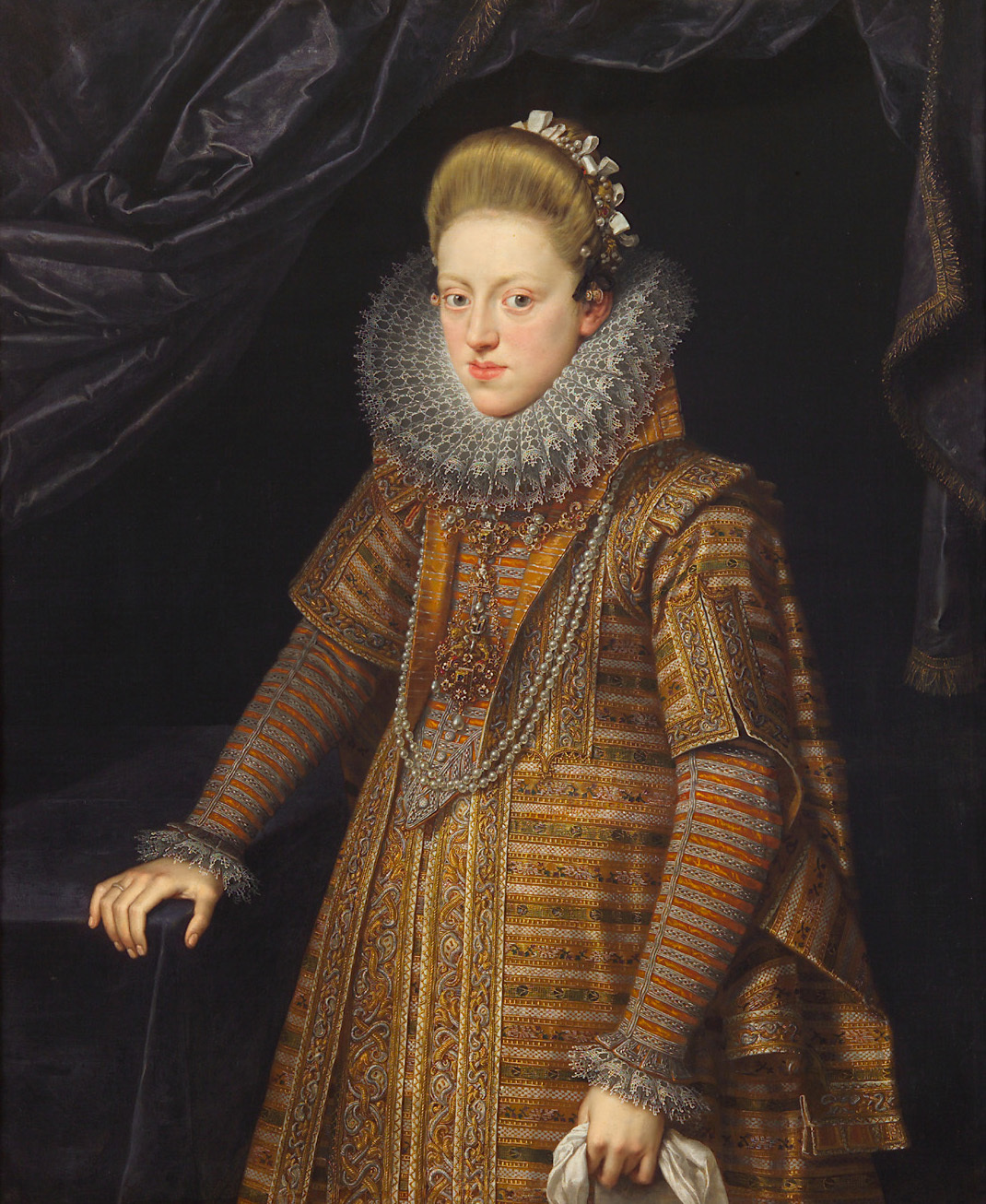
- Portrait of Archduchess Eleanor, by Frans Pourbus the younger, c. 1603
- Born: 25 September 1582; Graz, Duchy of Styria, Holy Roman Empire
- Died: 28 January 1620 (aged 37); Hall in Tirol, County of Tyrol, Holy Roman Empire
- Burial: Haller Jesuit Church
- House: Habsburg
- Father: Charles II, Archduke of Austria
- Mother: Maria Anna of Bavaria

Eleanor of Austria (25 September 1582 – 28 January 1620), was an Austrian archduchess and a member of the House of Habsburg.

She was the daughter of Charles II, Archduke of Austria, the son of Ferdinand I, Holy Roman Emperor; and of Maria Anna of Bavaria. Her elder brother Archduke Ferdinand succeeded as Holy Roman Emperor in 1619.

== Life ==
=== Birth and early years ===
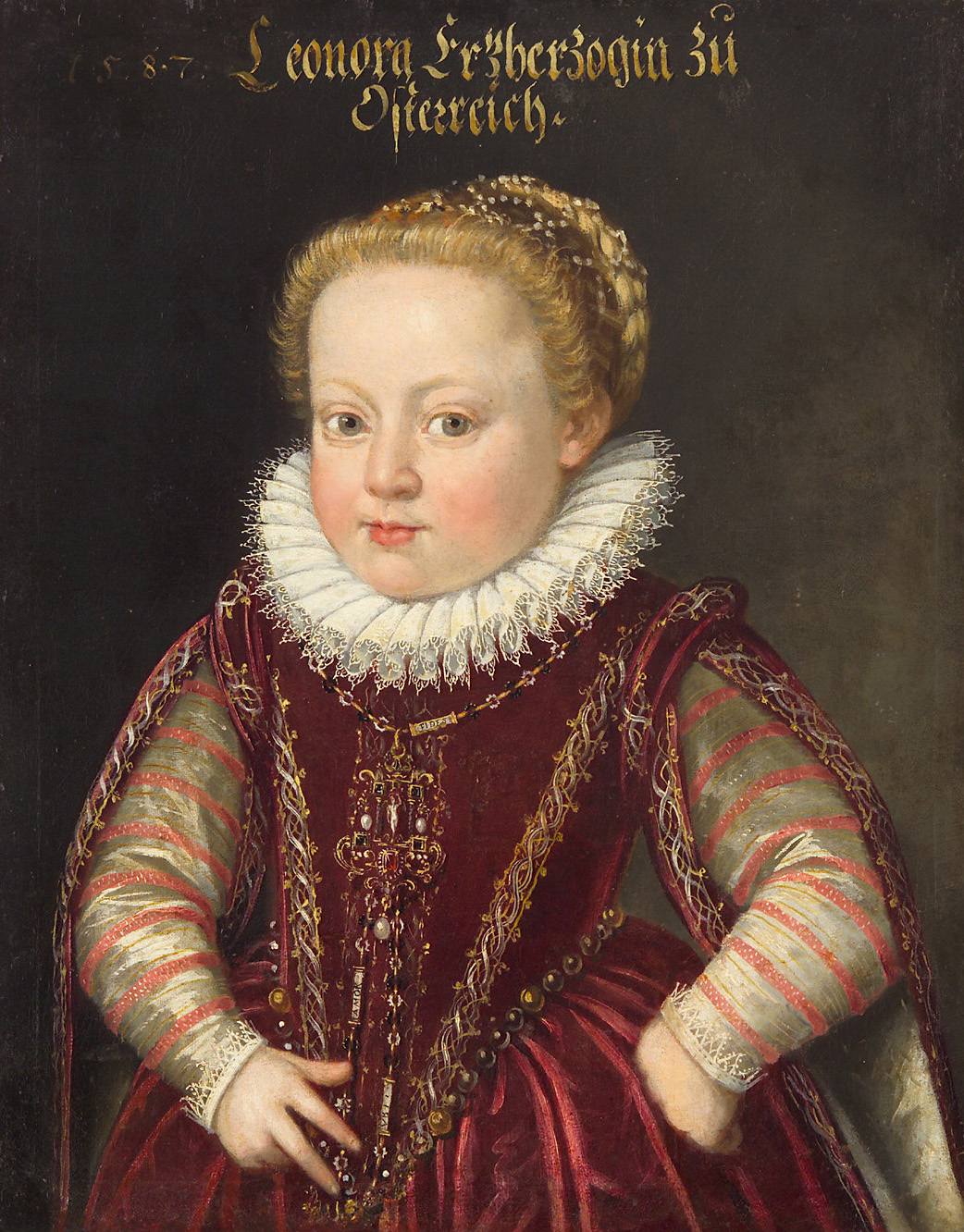
Archduchess Eleanor as a child, by Ottavio Zanuoli, 1587.

Born in Graz on 25 September 1582, Eleanor was the ninth child and sixth daughter of Archduke Charles II, ruler of Inner Austria (Styria, Carniola, Carinthia and Gorizia) and Maria Anna of Bavaria, a princess of the House of Wittelsbach.

Her paternal grandparents were Ferdinand I, Holy Roman Emperor, and Anne of Bohemia and Hungary (the last scion and heiress of the Hungarian branch of the House of Jagiellon after the death of her brother in 1526). Her maternal grandparents were of Albert V, Duke of Bavaria, and Archduchess Anna of Austria (member of the House of Habsburg and one of the daughters of Eleanor's own paternal grandparents).

Like all of her siblings, Eleanor suffered from the famous Habsburg inferior lip, and as a child, she suffered from smallpox, which forever undermined her health, which in turn was reflected in the character of the Archduchess: she was regarded as moody, and at court she led a secluded life, not devoid of small pleasures. For example, she loved confectionery, and at her request, fresh pastries were always brought to her. In case of refusal, she threw a tantrum. At the same time, Eleanor had good intellectual abilities.

=== Marriage attempts ===
Despite Eleanor's poor health, her brother and mother did not stop trying to find her a suitable husband. In 1595, in Rome, Cardinal Ottavio Paravicini presented three candidates for husbands to the Archduchess: Ranuccio I Farnese, Duke of Parma, Prince Francis of Lorraine and Francesco Maria II della Rovere, Duke of Urbino. Her mother was worried about the young age of the Archduchess, and the suitors were interested in her ability to bear children. But even a childless marriage, in the case of widowhood, provided her with a maintenance of 50,000 guilders per year. Next to Eleanor was always the physician Hippolytus Guarinonius, who brilliantly coped with his duties. However, it was the poor health of the intended bride that was the main reason for the failed marriage negotiations.

Eleanor, along with her elder sister Archduchess Gregoria Maximiliana and her younger sister Archduchess Margaret, were considered as potential bride of Philip, Prince of Asturias, only surviving son and heir of King Philip II of Spain. Portraits of the three sisters were sent to the Spanish court. The choice of Prince Philip was Margaret, but by the will of his father, he was betrothed to Gregoria Maximiliana. Having not been selected as the future Queen of Spain, Eleanor's relatives abandoned their attempts to marry her.

=== Nun at Tyrol. Death ===
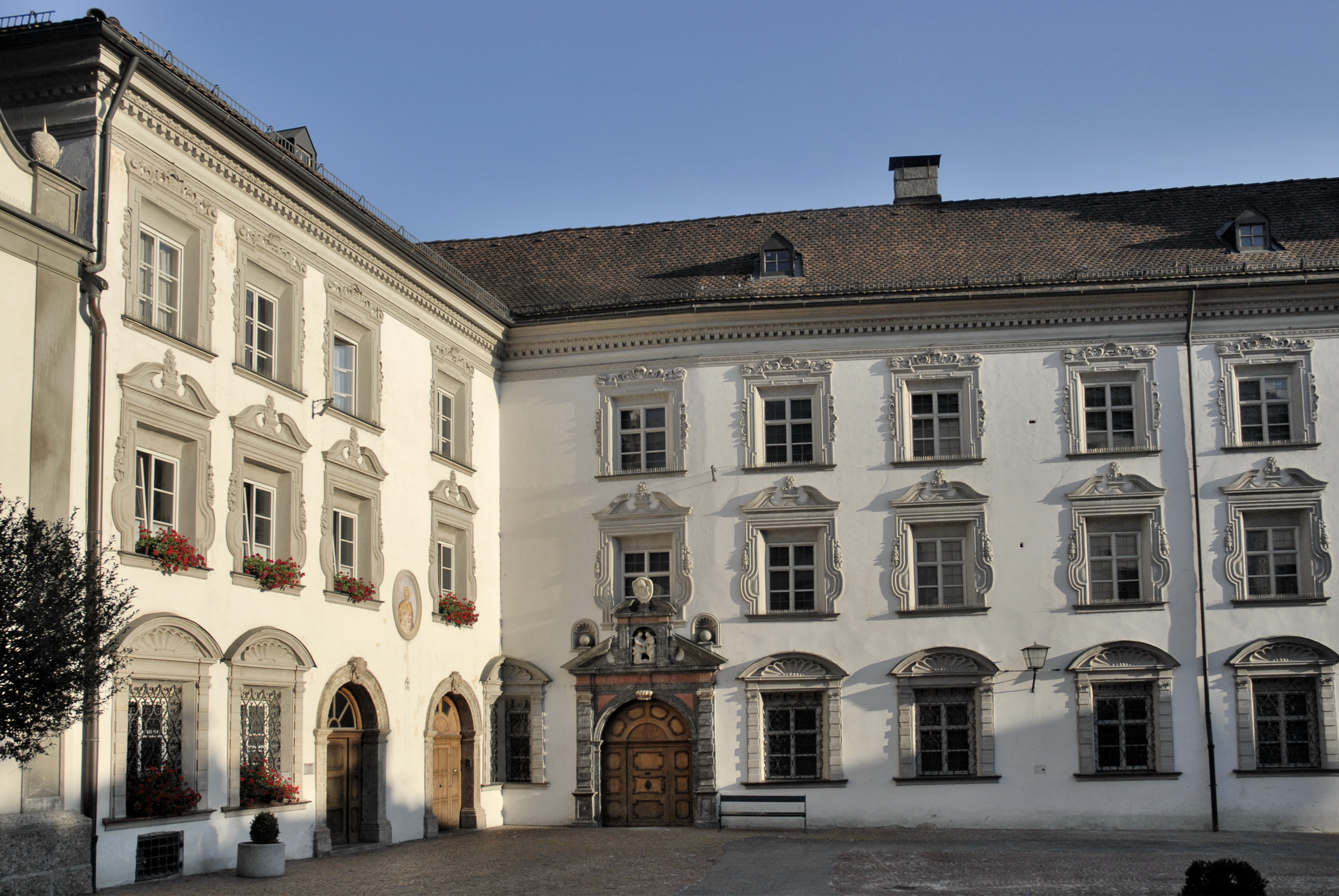
The Damenstift in Hall in Tirol.

Resigned to the impossibility of marriage, Eleanor, joined by her older sister Archduchess Maria Christina (who returned to her homeland after her disastrous marriage), decided to retire from the world. The sisters chose the Haller Convent (Haller Damenstift) in Hall in Tirol, founded by their paternal aunt Archduchess Magdalena of Austria. Ferdinand II gave the sisters a small allowance to use: for Maria Christina, silverware of 11,000 guilders and for Eleanor, 2,000 imperial pfennigs. Upon entering the convent, the Archduchesses renounced all their titles and became mere novices.

In the very first years, Eleanor's health problems worsened —she had intense pains in her stomach, but she did not leave the convent. On 3 October 1607, both sisters took the veil. As a monastic dowry, their brother gave them 100,000 guilders. In 1612, Eleanor was chosen as Abbess. She herself endured bodily infirmities and the strict monastic life finally destroyed her already poor health. A cataract was discovered in early January 1620, which soon led to her becoming completely blind. Eleanor died in the Haller Damenstift on 28 January 1620 and was buried in the Haller Jesuit Church (Haller Jesuitenkirche) in Hall in Tirol.

== In culture ==
Several portraits of Eleanor are known. A portrait of a child from 1587, attributed to Ottavio Zanuoli, is currently in the collection of the Kunsthistorisches Museum in Vienna. In a family portrait attributed to Juan Pantoja de la Cruz around 1600, she is depicted with her parents –her father in the robe of a priest (John the Evangelist), giving communion to her mother in the robe of a nun (Virgin Mary), with some brothers, in church vestments, and sisters, coming to communion. The family is depicted at the altar in the name of St. John the Evangelist. The painting is in the Convent of Las Descalzas Reales in Madrid. Another portrait of Eleanor in the collection of the Kunsthistorisches Museum was painted by Frans Pourbus the Younger and dates from around 1603. On one of the portraits by an unknown artist, which contains an inscription that described that Eleanor was depicted there, according to the art critic Maike Vogt-Luerssen, was her older sister Gregoria Maximiliana the real sitter of this painting.

== Ancestors ==
Ancestors of Archduchess Eleanor of Austria (1582–1620)

16. Maximilian I, Holy Roman Emperor
8. Philip I of Castile (= 28)
17. Mary of Burgundy
4. Ferdinand I, Holy Roman Emperor (=14)
18. Ferdinand II of Aragon
9. Joanna of Castile (= 29)
19. Isabella I of Castile
2. Charles II of Austria
20. Casimir IV Jagiellon
10. Vladislas II of Bohemia and Hungary (= 30)
21. Elisabeth of Austria
5. Anna of Bohemia and Hungary (=15)
22. Gaston de Foix, Count of Candale
11. Anna of Foix-Candale (= 31)
23. Catherine of Foix
1. Archduchess Eleanor of Austria
24. Albert IV, Duke of Bavaria
12. William IV, Duke of Bavaria
25. Kunigunde of Austria
6. Albert V, Duke of Bavaria
26. Philip I, Margrave of Baden
13. Marie of Baden-Sponheim
27. Elisabeth of the Palatinate
3. Maria Anna of Bavaria
28. Philip I of Castile (= 8)
14. Ferdinand I, Holy Roman Emperor (= 4)
29. Joanna of Castile (= 9)
7. Anna of Austria
30. Vladislas II of Bohemia and Hungary (= 10)
15. Anna of Bohemia and Hungary (= 5)
31. Anna of Foix-Candale (= 11)

== Sources ==
- Hurter, Friedrich von (1860). Bild einer christlichen Fürstin. Maria, Erzherzogin zu Oesterreich, Herzogin von Bayern (in German). Hurter.
