= Seckau Abbey =

Benedictine monastery in Styria, Austria

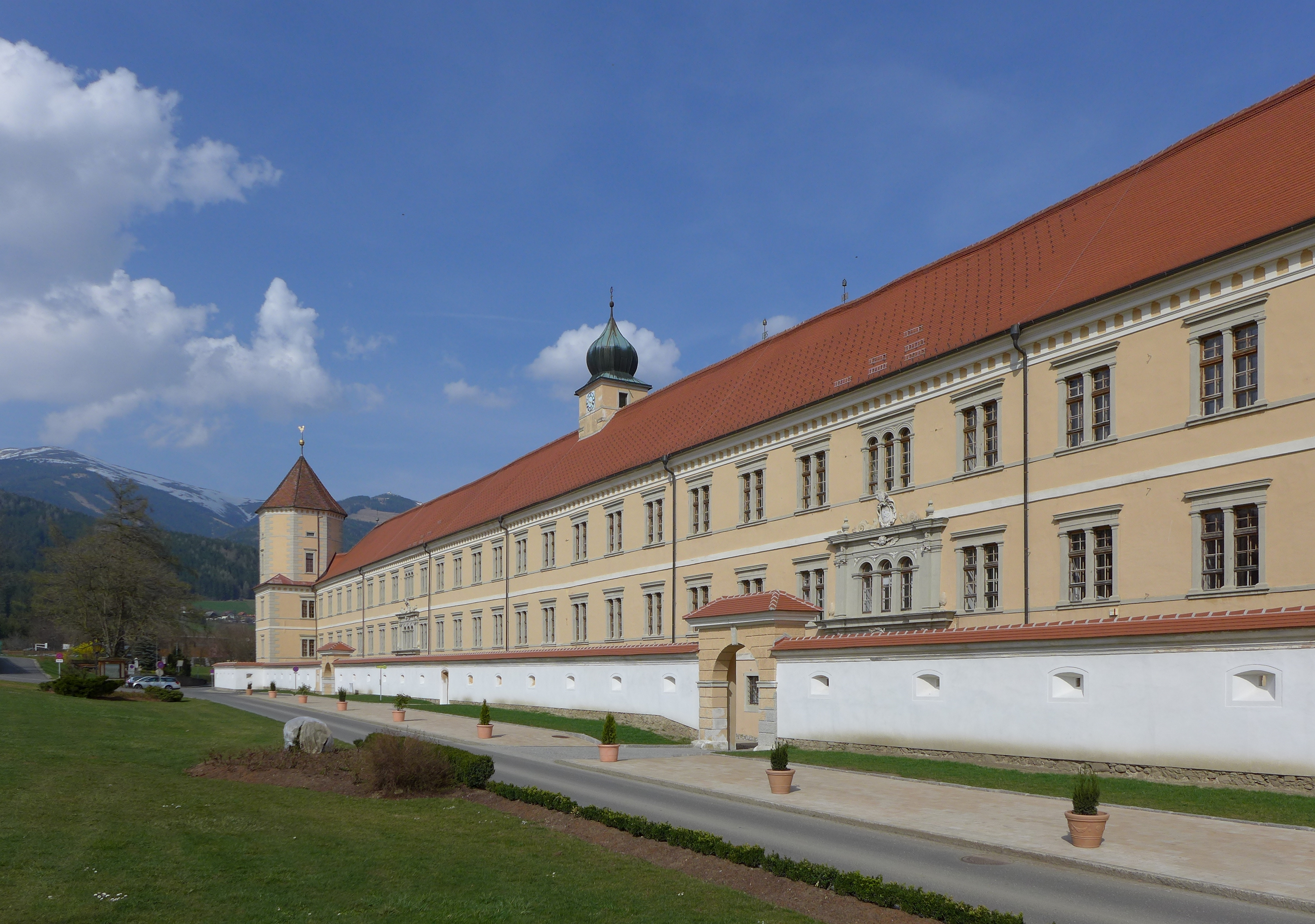
- Seckau Abbey, Styria, Austria

- Location within Austria

Religion
- Affiliation: Catholic Church
- Ecclesiastical or organisational status: Abbey
- Year consecrated: 1164
- Status: Active

Location
- Location: Seckau in Styria, Austria
- Coordinates: 47.273889°N 14.786111°E

Architecture
- Type: Abbey
- Style: Romanesque
- Founder: Archbishop Konrad I of Salzburg
- Groundbreaking: 1143

Website
- www.abtei-seckau.at

Seckau Abbey (German: Abtei Unserer Lieben Frau ) is a Benedictine monastery and Co-Cathedral in Seckau in Styria, Austria.

== History ==
=== Middle Ages ===
Seckau Abbey was endowed in 1140 by Augustinian canons. An already existing community in Sankt Marein bei Knittelfeld was moved to Seckau in 1142. This establishment was dissolved in 1782. At the request of Archbishop Konrad I of Salzburg, Pope Innocent II instituted the founding of the congregation and the transfer to Seckau on 12 March 1143. The abbey church, a Romanesque basilica, was built from 1143 to 1164, and was consecrated on 16 September 1164.

According to an old custom, the canons founded a double monastery. The women's chorus likely came to the abbey no later than 1150 from Salzburg, mentioned in a deed of the Noble Burchard of Mureck in 1150.

=== Seckau Abbey ===
In 1883 the monastery was resettled by Benedictines from Beuron Archabbey, who had had to leave Germany because of the Kulturkampf. In 1940 the monks were evicted by the Gestapo and the buildings were confiscated. In 1945 the monks were able to return.

The abbey maintains a secondary school ("Gymnasium") and carries out the duties of the pastoral care belonging to a parish.

It is part of the Beuronese Congregation within the Benedictine Confederation.

== Abbey church ==
The abbey church, a Romanesque basilica, was built between 1143 and 1164. For centuries it was the place of burial of the Inner Austrian line of the Habsburgs. In 1930 it was declared a minor basilica.

== Gallery ==
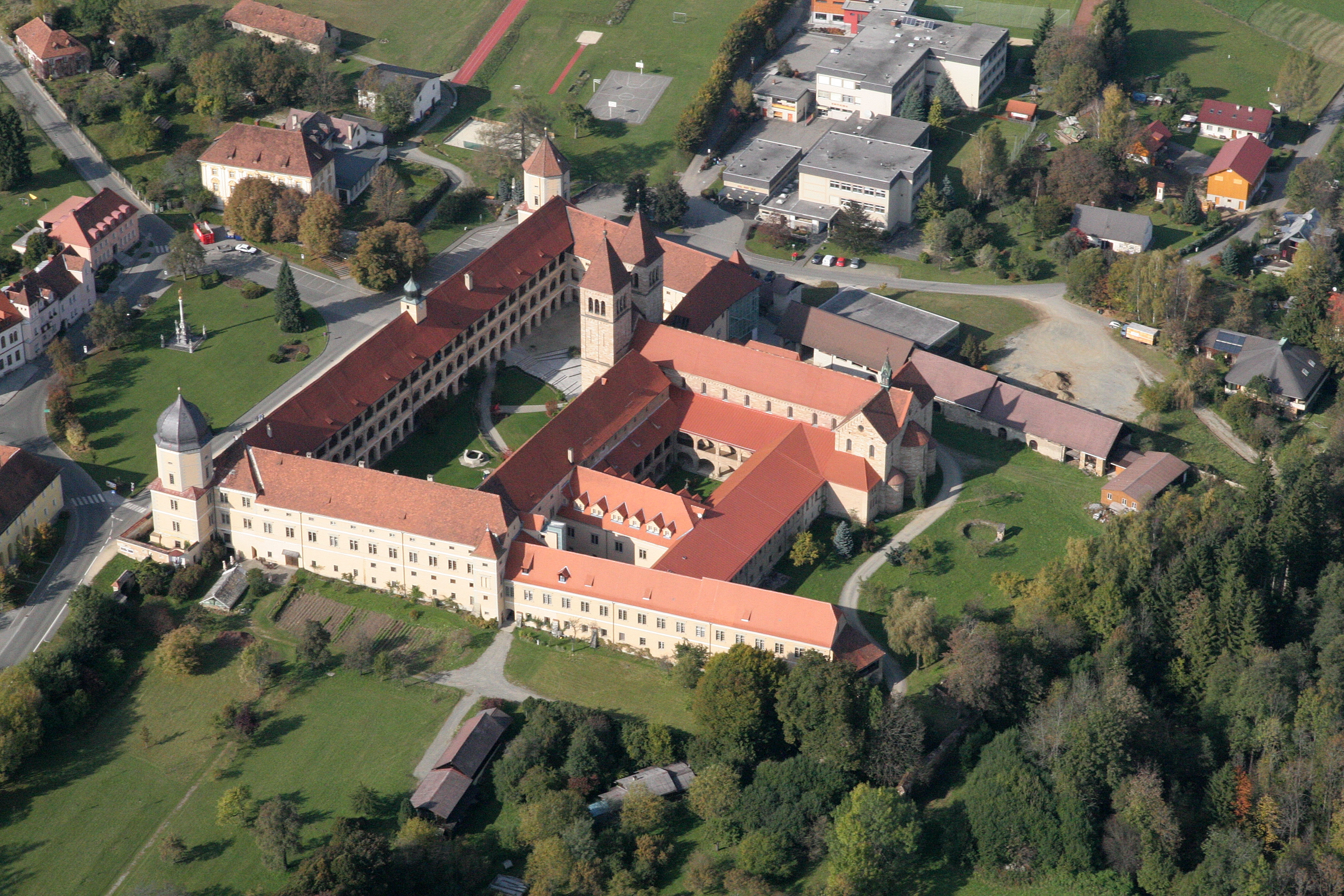
Seckau Abbey

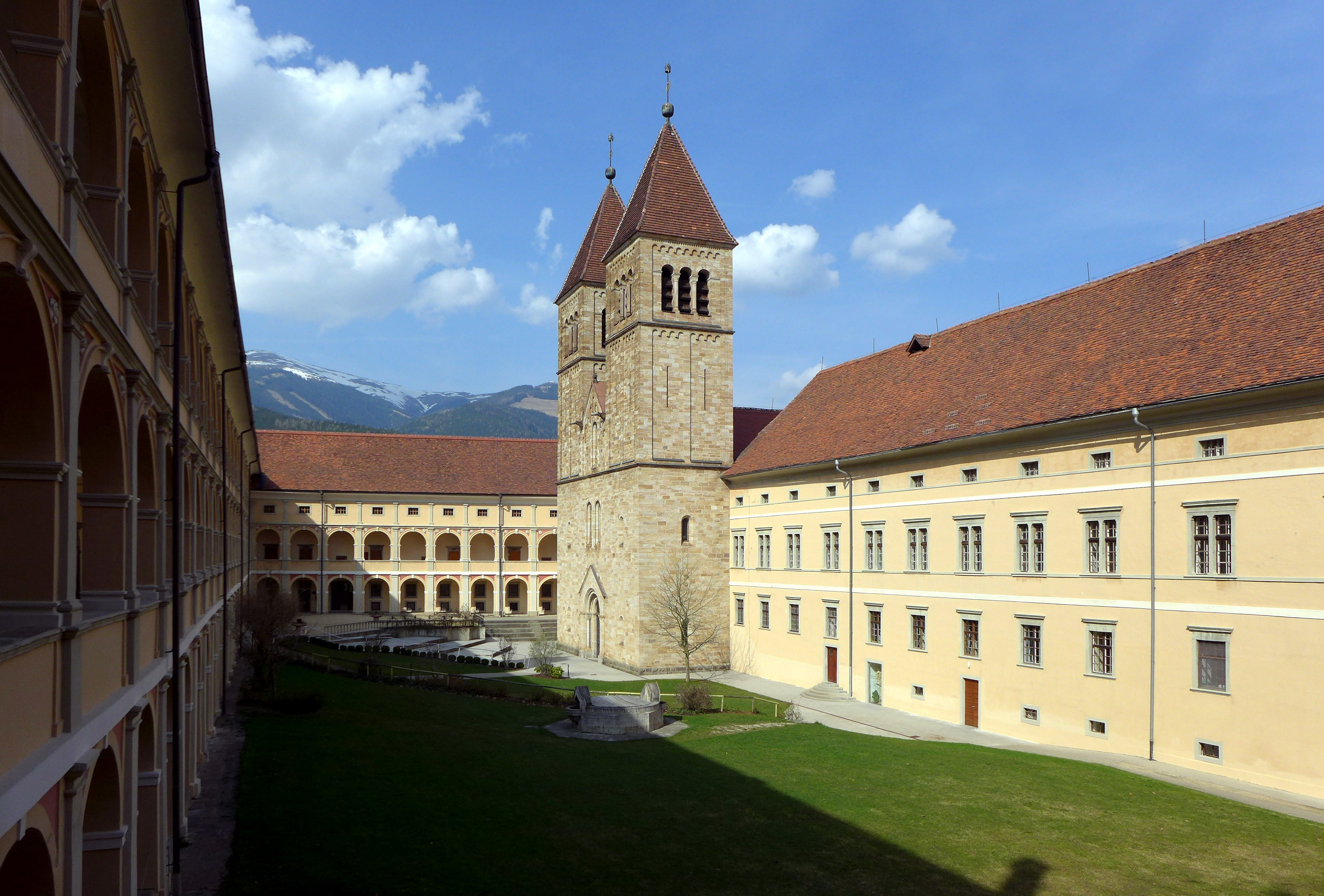
Seckau Abbey courtyard

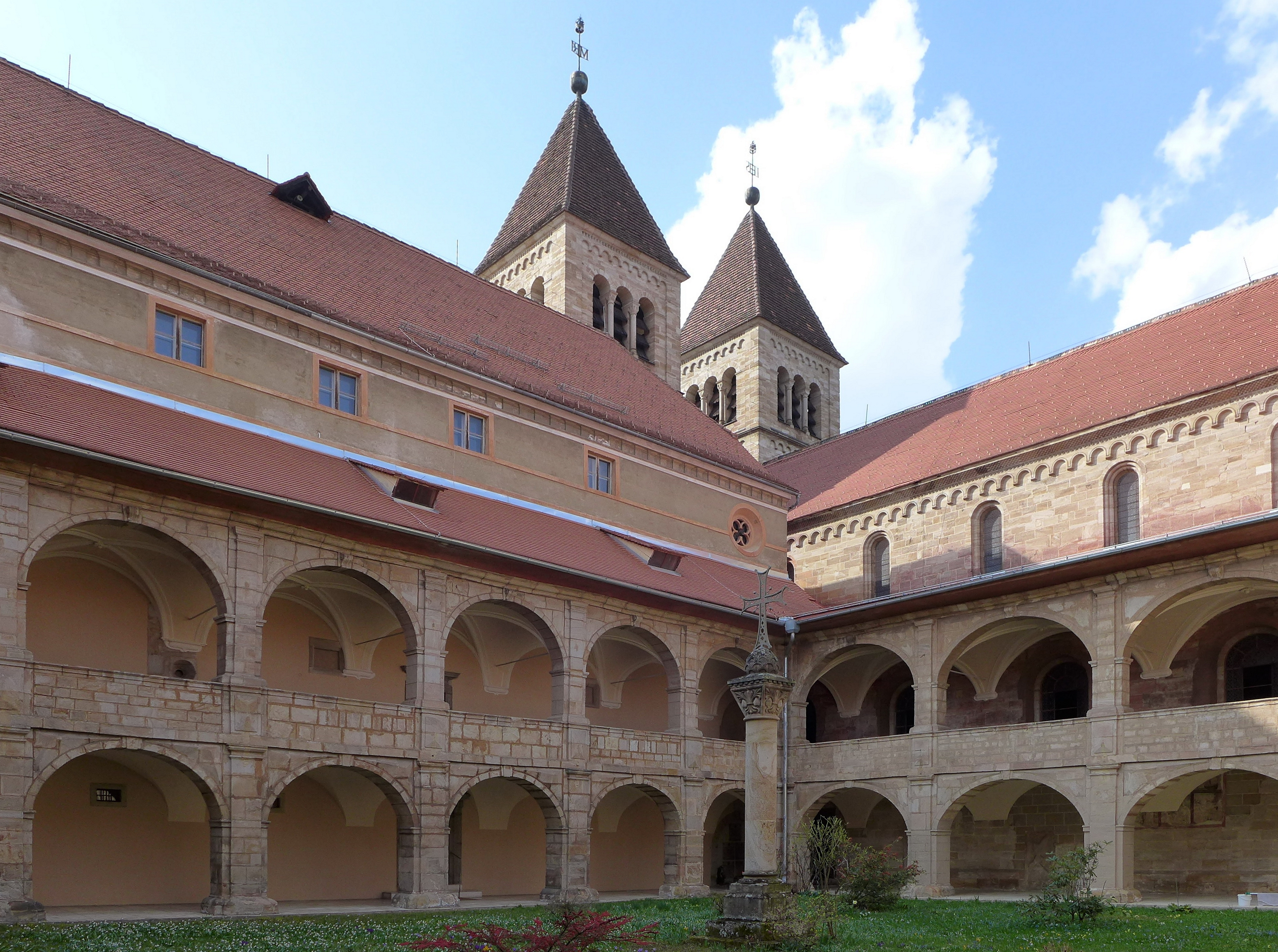
Seckau Abbey inner courtyard

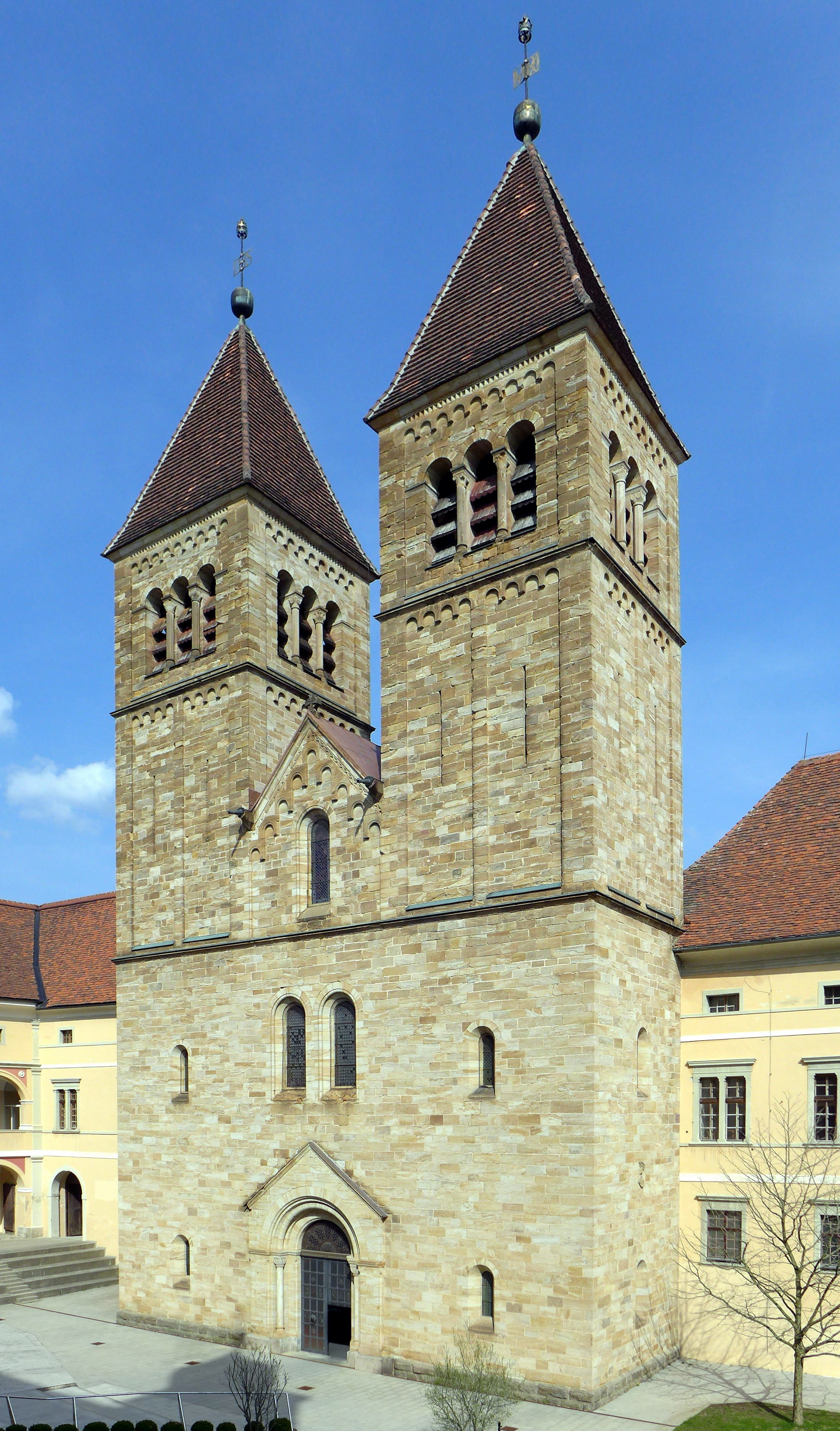
Basilica spires

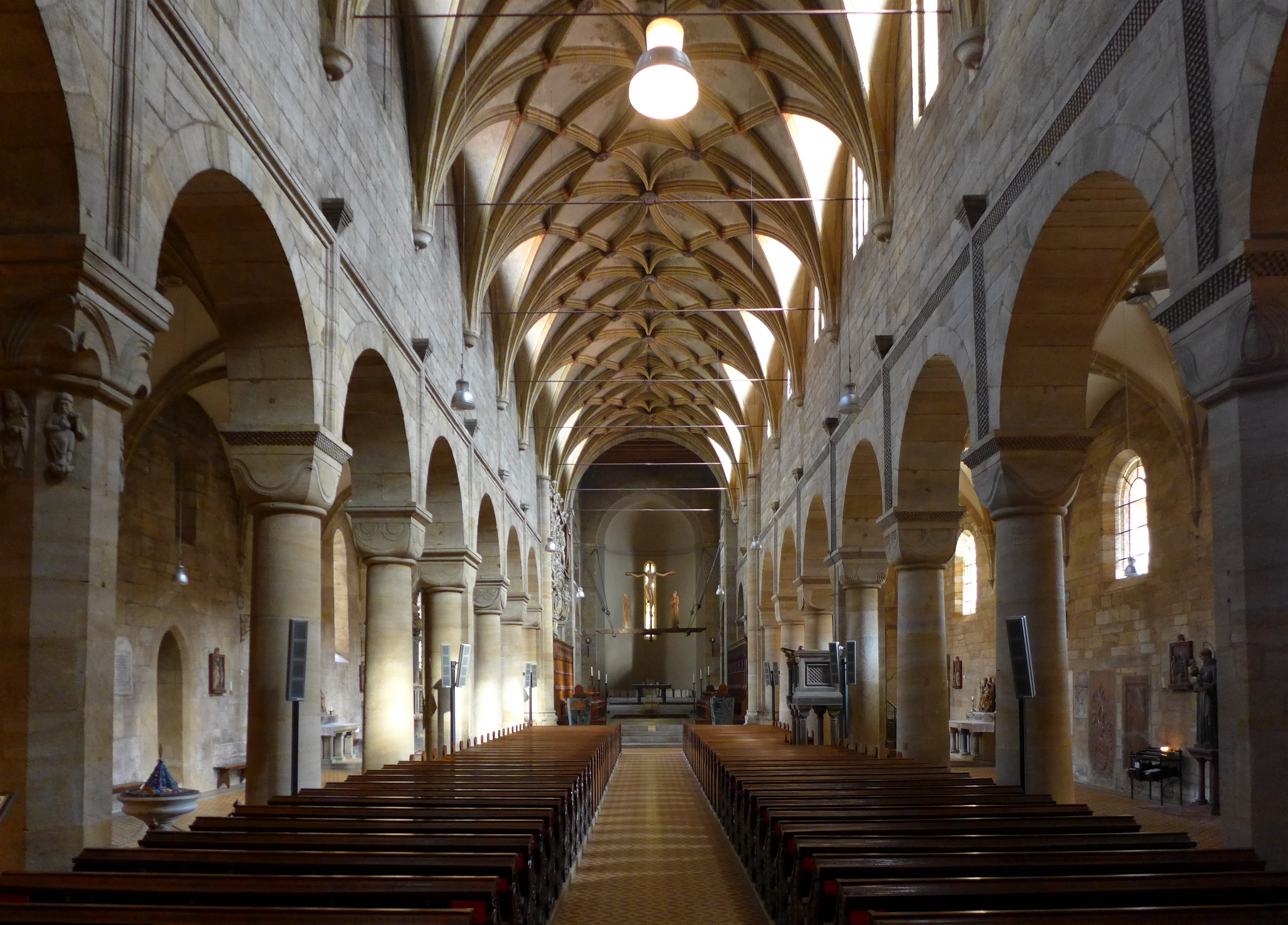
Basilica Seckau - interior

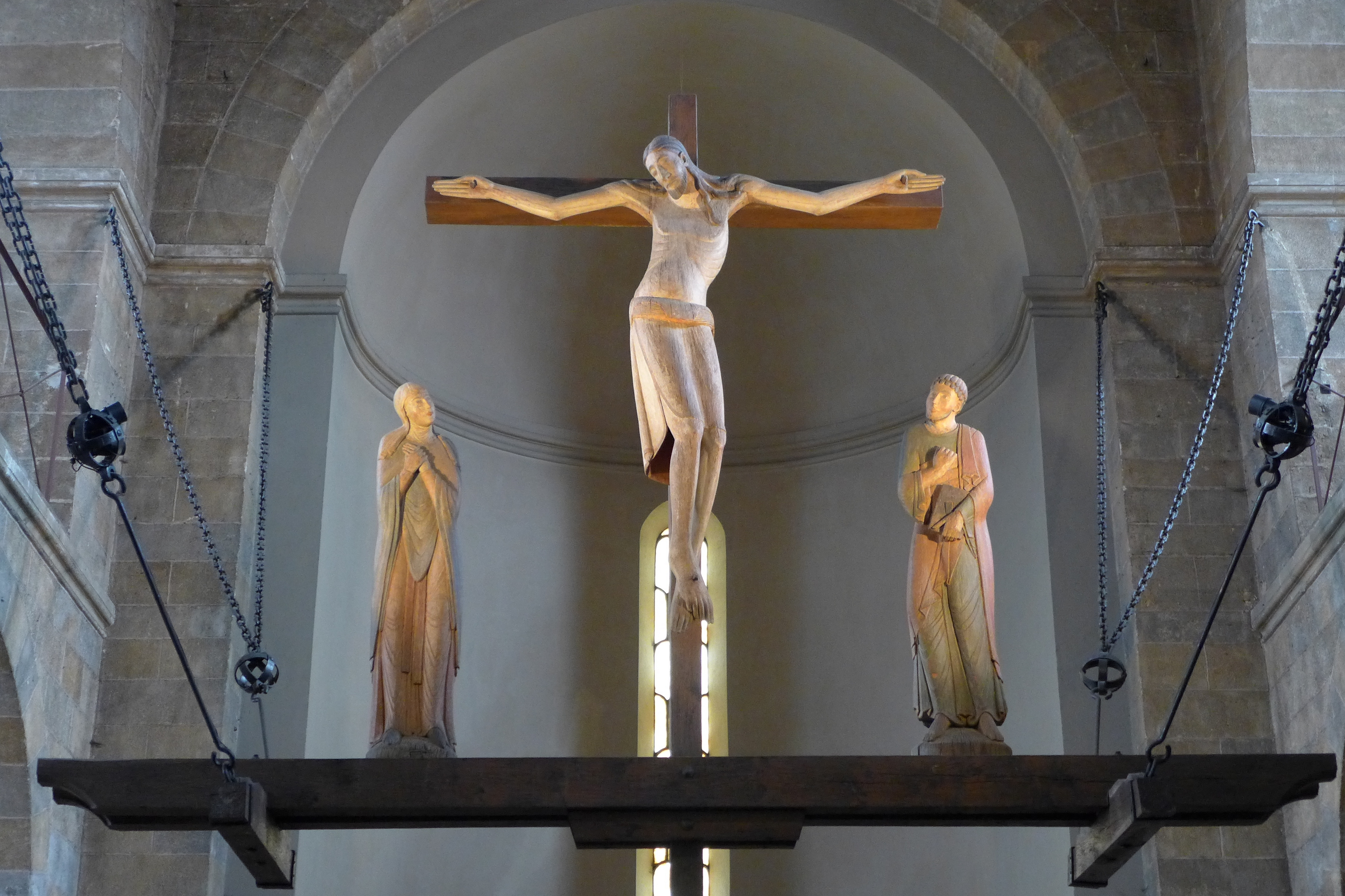
Romanesque Crucifixion scene

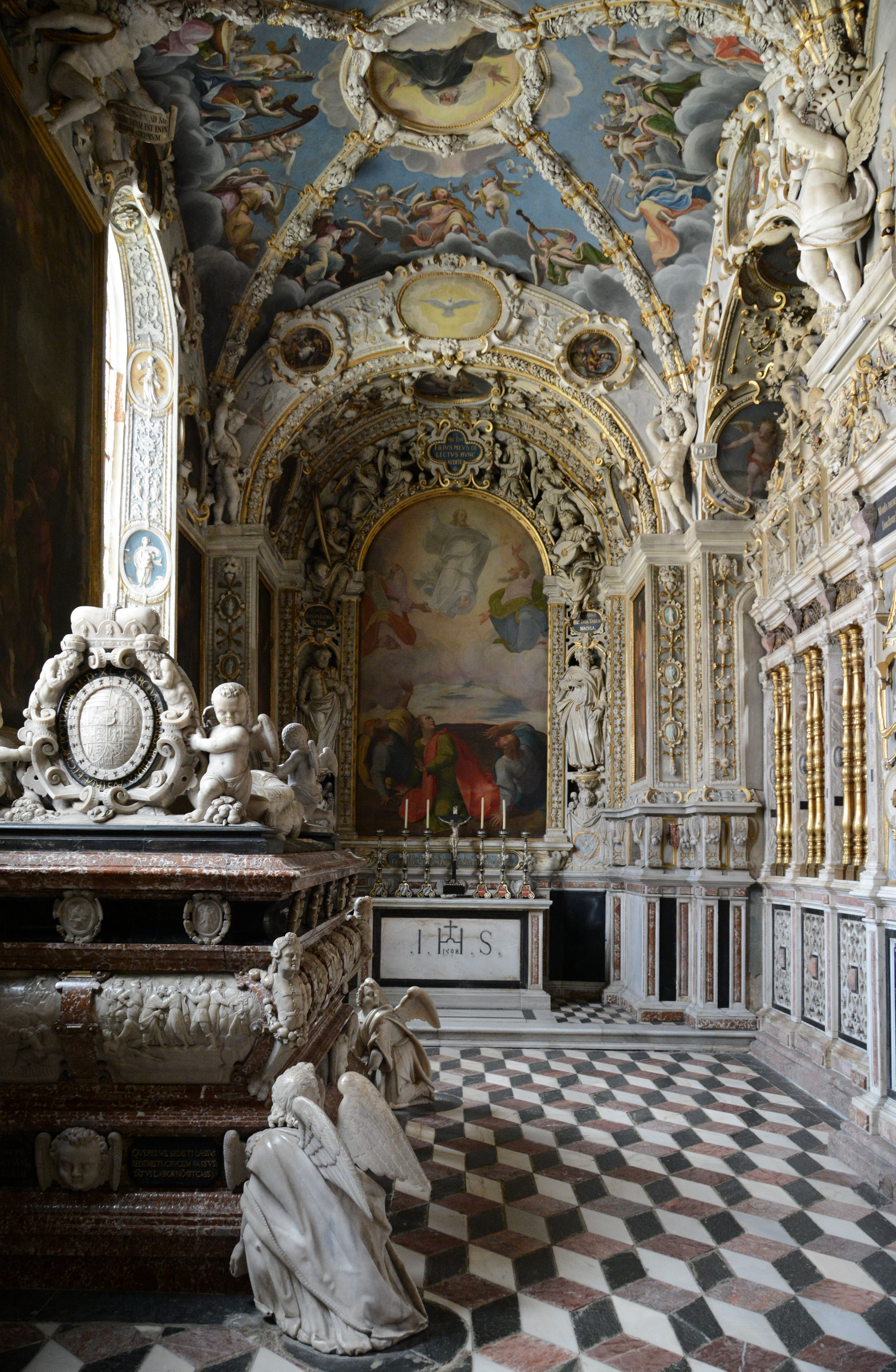
Habsburg mausoleum

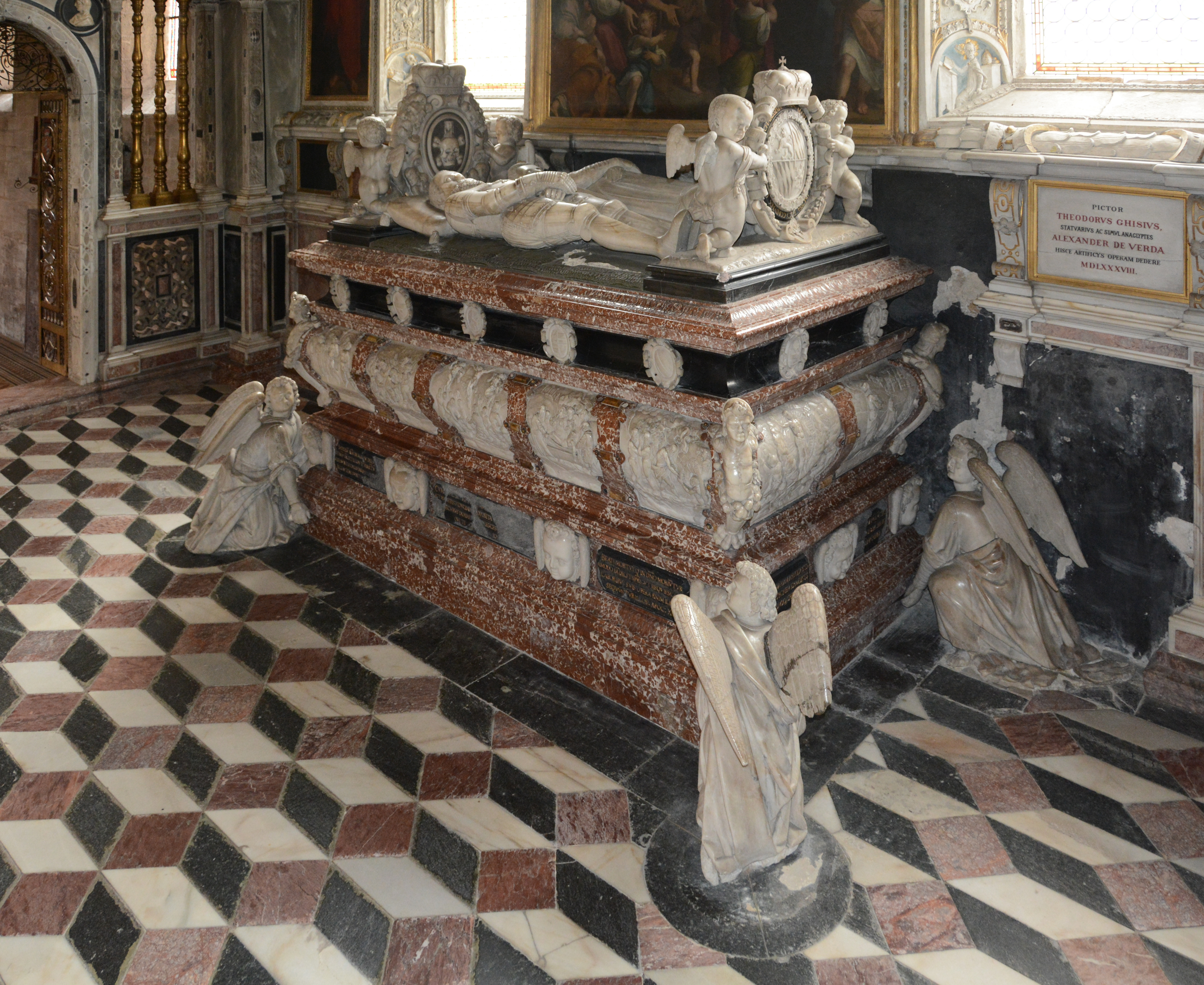
Habsburg Mausoleum, cenotaph

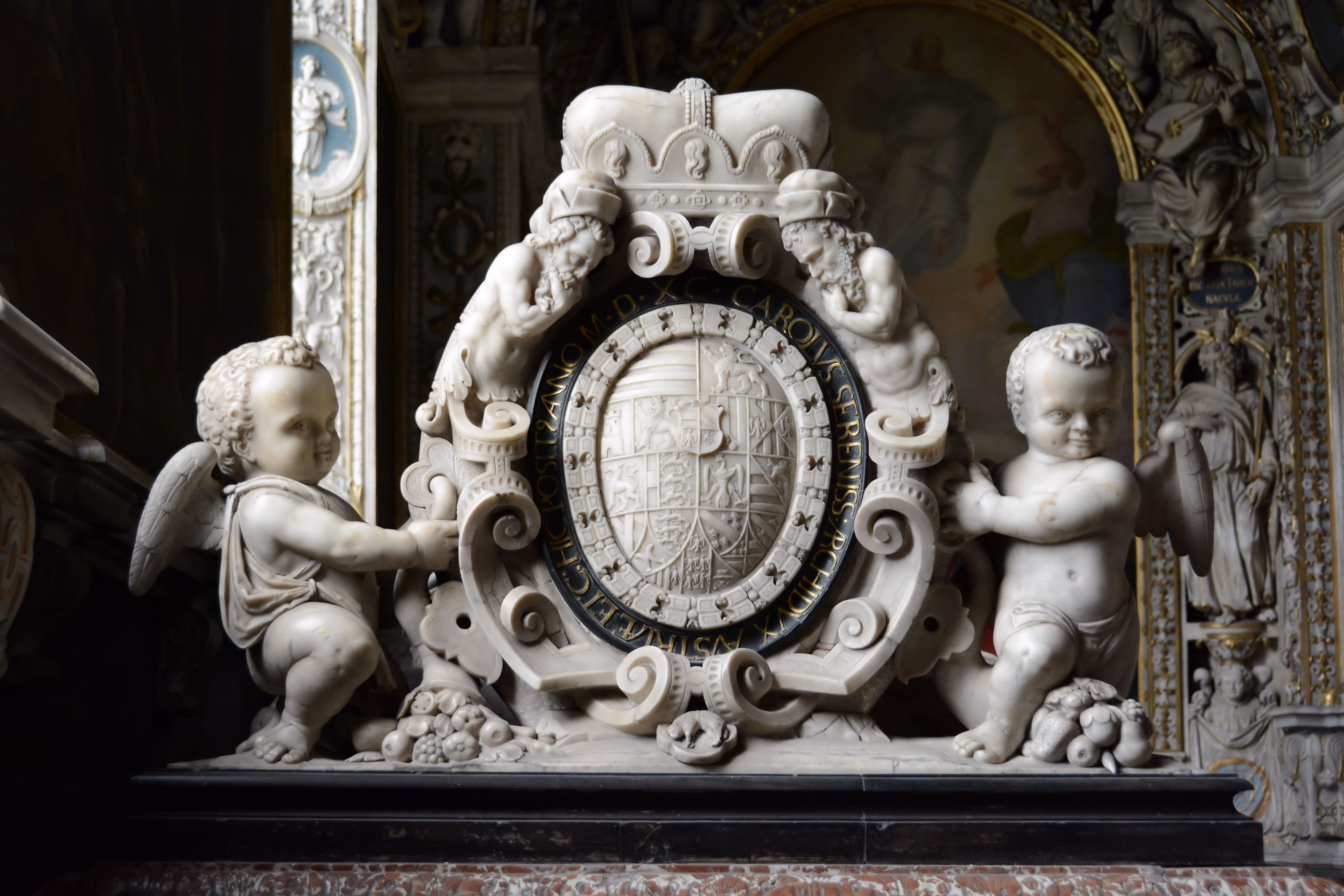
Habsburg mausoleum (detail)

== In numismatics ==
Seckau Abbey was selected in 2008 as a main motif for a high value Austrian euro collectors' coin: the Seckau Abbey commemorative coin. The obverse shows a wide view of Seckau Abbey looking west. Located in the center is the Romanesque basilica with its two towers surrounded by the Baroque monastic buildings. The reverse shows a view from the main entrance of the church to the high altar, depicting the mediaeval crucifixion group hanging on four massive chains.
