= Archduchess Barbara of Austria =

Barbara of Austria
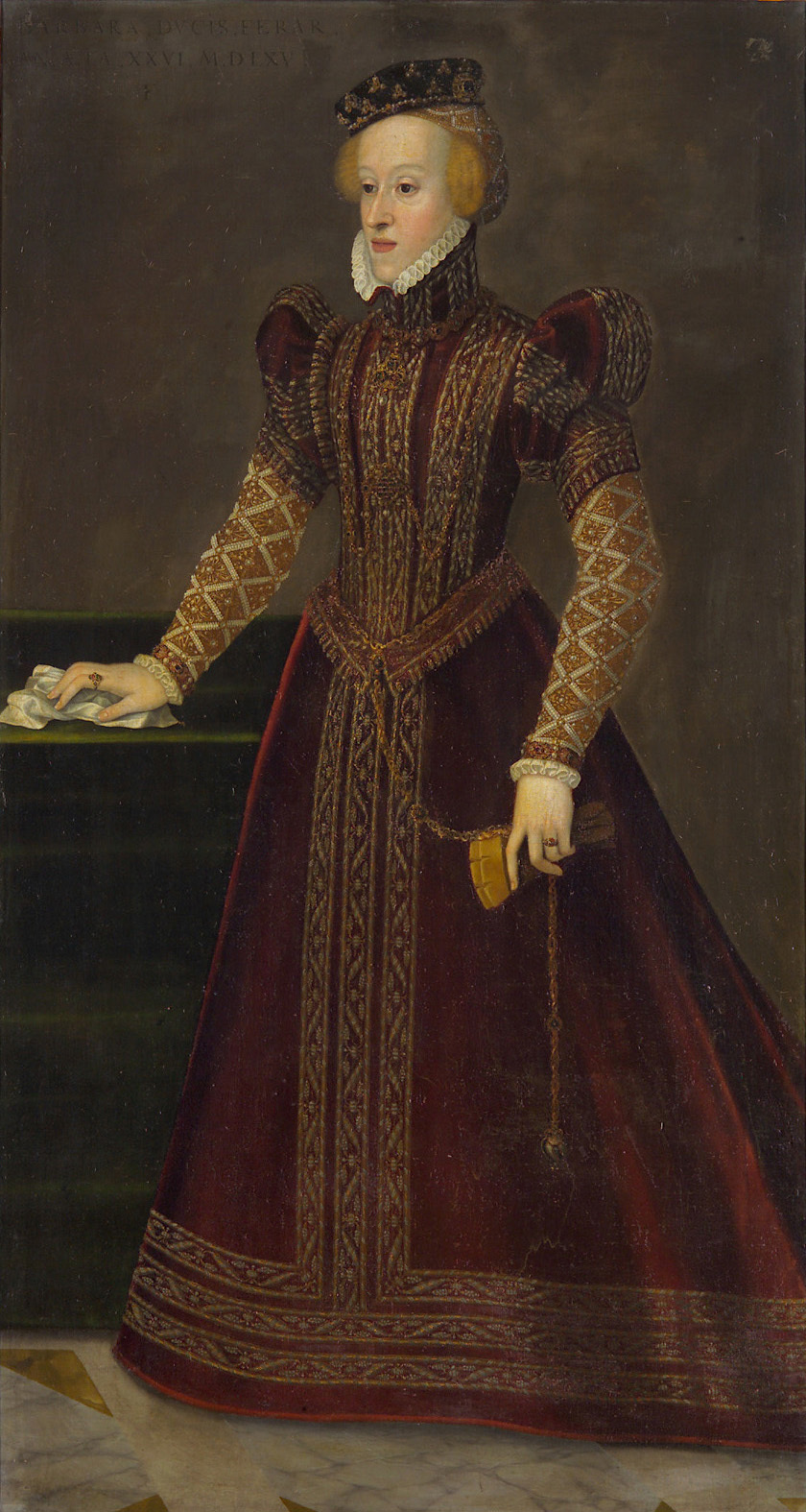
- Portrait by Francesco Terzi c. 1565

Duchess consort of Ferrara
- Tenure: 5 December 1565 – 19 September 1572

Duchess consort of Modena and Reggio
- Tenure: 5 December 1565 – 19 September 1572
- Born: 30 April 1539; Vienna, Archduchy of Austria, Holy Roman Empire
- Died: 19 September 1572 (aged 33); Ferrara, Duchy of Ferrara
- Burial: Church of the Gesù, Ferrara
- Spouse: Alfonso II d'Este, Duke of Ferrara, Modena and Reggio (m. 1565)
- House: Habsburg
- Father: Ferdinand I, Holy Roman Emperor
- Mother: Anna of Bohemia and Hungary

Barbara of Austria (30 April 1539 – 19 September 1572), was an Archduchess of Austria as a member of the House of Habsburg and by marriage Duchess consort of Ferrara, Modena and Reggio during 1565–1572.

== Life ==
=== Early years ===
Born in Vienna on 30 April 1539, Barbara was the eleventh child and eighth daughter of Ferdinand I, Holy Roman Emperor and Anna of Bohemia and Hungary. On her father's side she was the granddaughter of King Philip I of Castile (also Duke of Burgundy) and Queen Joanna of Castile. On her mother's side, she was the granddaughter of King Vladislaus II of Hungary and Anne of Foix-Candale (who in turn was through her own mother Infanta Catherine of Navarre, a granddaughter of Queen Eleanor of Navarre and Gaston IV, Count of Foix).

In the winter of 1547, the widowed Emperor Ferdinand I entrusted all his unmarried daughters to the care of nuns in the monastery in Innsbruck, where Barbara lived until her marriage. Only once, in 1552, during the invasion of the Tyrol by the Protestant army under the command of Maurice, Elector of Saxony, did Barbara and her sisters Magdalena, Margaret, Helena and Joanna, spend some time outside the monastery at Bruneck Castle.

Barbara received a deeply religious Catholic upbringing. The characteristic features of her education, based on the writings of the Jesuits Peter Canisius and Diego Laynez, were religiosity and charity. Her confessors were also Jesuits.

Contemporaries had different opinions about Barbara's physical appearance. The papal nuncio at the imperial court in Vienna, Cardinal Zaccaria Delfino, considered her ugly. Florentine diplomat Antonio degli Albizzi in correspondence described Barbara's appearance as mediocre. He also pointed the presence of Prognathism in her — a characteristic anatomical peculiarity which appeared in many members of the House of Habsburg. The Venetian diplomat Alvise Contarini, on the other hand, considered Barbara the most beautiful of the unmarried Archduchesses.

=== Marriage ===
In 1560, Barbara was considered as a wife for Guglielmo Gonzaga, Duke of Mantua, who later married Eleanor, Barbara's elder sister. In 1562, several suitors came to Emperor Ferdinand I to ask for the hand of his youngest daughter Joanna, among them John Sigismund Zápolya, Francesco de' Medici, Crown Prince of Florence and Alfonso II d'Este, Duke of Ferrara, Modena and Reggio. Alfonso II began negotiations for marriage in November 1563.

A dynastic marriage with the head of the House of Este was beneficial to the House of Habsburg, who sought to reduce the traditional influence of the French kings over the dukes of Ferrara. However, in order to avoid a conflict between the Houses of Medici and Este, the Emperor proposed that Barbara marry Alfonso II. This decision was supported by King Philip II of Spain, an ally of the Duchy of Florence.

Barbara first met Alfonso II in July 1565, when he visited Innsbruck to get to know her. In November of the same year, she and Joanna arrived in Trento, where Pope Pius IV sent his legates to conduct a double marriage ceremony, Joanna to Francesco de' Medici and Barbara to Alfonso d'Este. The ceremony was postponed due to a quarrel between the grooms-to-be over who had precedence in the ceremony. In the end, the brides went separately to the respective capitals of their future spouses (Florence and Ferrara) to marry.

On 1 December 1565, Barbara arrived in Ferrara, and on 5 December she was married to Alfonso II, Duke of Ferrara, Modena and Reggio. The wedding celebrations, during which a "Temple of Love" was built and a grand tournament took place, lasted until 9 December. Among the guests at the wedding were the former fiancé of Barbara, the Duke of Mantua, with his wife, her older sister. Torquato Tasso (at that time the court poet of the Dukes of Ferrara) was a witness to the solemn entry of the bride's procession to Ferrara and subsequent wedding; he later described what he saw in his pastoral drama "Aminta", in which he dedicated several canzones in praise of Barbara. The celebrations were cut short because of the death of Pope Pius IV.

On becoming duchess of Ferrara, Barbara won the love of her subjects through the merciful way in which she treated all those in need. Despite her not speaking Italian, she and her husband enjoyed a complete understanding. Their marriage, which proved childless, was happy. When, a year after the wedding, Alfonso II participated in the war against the Ottoman Empire, Barbara was sincerely worried about her husband. The experience negatively impaired her health; from that time she was reported as being constantly ill.

Despite being a devout Catholic, Barbara was able to forge an excellent relationship with her Protestant mother-in-law Renée of France. The Duchess's confessors in Ferrara, as well as in Innsbruck, were Jesuits, to whom Barbara provided special patronage. After the devastating earthquakes in 1570 and 1571 in the Duchy of Ferrara, she supported young orphaned girls. To this end, she founded the Conservatore delle orfane di Santa Barbara in Ferrara. In the period between earthquakes, the Duchess herself was forced to live in a tent, which exacerbated her health problems.

=== Premature death ===
Barbara died of tuberculosis in Ferrara on 19 September 1572. Her untimely death caused grief among her subjects, with the Jesuits grieving the most. The leadership of the order allowed the Duke to bury his wife in the altar of the Ferrarese Church of the Gesù. Seven years later, Alfonso II married for the third time to Margherita Gonzaga, who was Barbara's niece.

== In culture ==
Torquato Tasso dedicated several sonnets, canzones, eulogies and dialogues to Barbara of Austria. Another Italian poet, Giovanni Battista Guarini, also dedicated a canzon to her. The collection of the Kunsthistorisches Museum in Vienna contains two portraits of Barbara. In the early one, a work of Giuseppe Arcimboldo, she is depicted during the period of her negotiations of her marriage to Alfonso II in 1563-1564, in a portrait presumably made for her future husband. In another portrait of 1565, made after her marriage, she is depicted full size. This portrait is work of Francesco Terzi.

== Ancestry ==
Ancestors of Archduchess Barbara of Austria

8. Maximilian I, Holy Roman Emperor
4. Philip I of Castile
9. Mary, Duchess of Burgundy
2. Ferdinand I, Holy Roman Emperor
10. Ferdinand II of Aragon
5. Joanna I of Castile
11. Isabella I of Castile
1. Barbara of Austria
12. Casimir IV Jagiellon
6. Vladislaus II of Bohemia and Hungary
13. Elisabeth of Austria
3. Anne of Bohemia and Hungary
14. Gaston de Foix, Count of Candale
7. Anne of Foix-Candale
15. Catherine of Foix

Archduchess Barbara of Austria House of Habsburg Born: 30 April 1539 Died: 19 September 1572
Royal titles
Vacant Title last held by Lucrezia de' Medici	Duchess consort of Ferrara, Modena and Reggio; 5 December 1565 – 19 September 1572	Vacant Title next held by Margherita Gonzaga
