= Helena of Austria =

Helena of Austria may refer to:

- Helena of Hungary, Duchess of Austria (c. 1155–1199), daughter of Géza II of Hungary and wife of Leopold V, Duke of Austria
- Archduchess Helena of Austria (1543–1574), daughter of Ferdinand I, Holy Roman Emperor and Anna of Bohemia and Hungary
- Archduchess Helena of Austria (1903–1924), daughter of Archduke Peter Ferdinand, Hereditary Duchess of Württemberg
