= Anna of Bohemia and Hungary =

European queen (1503–1547)

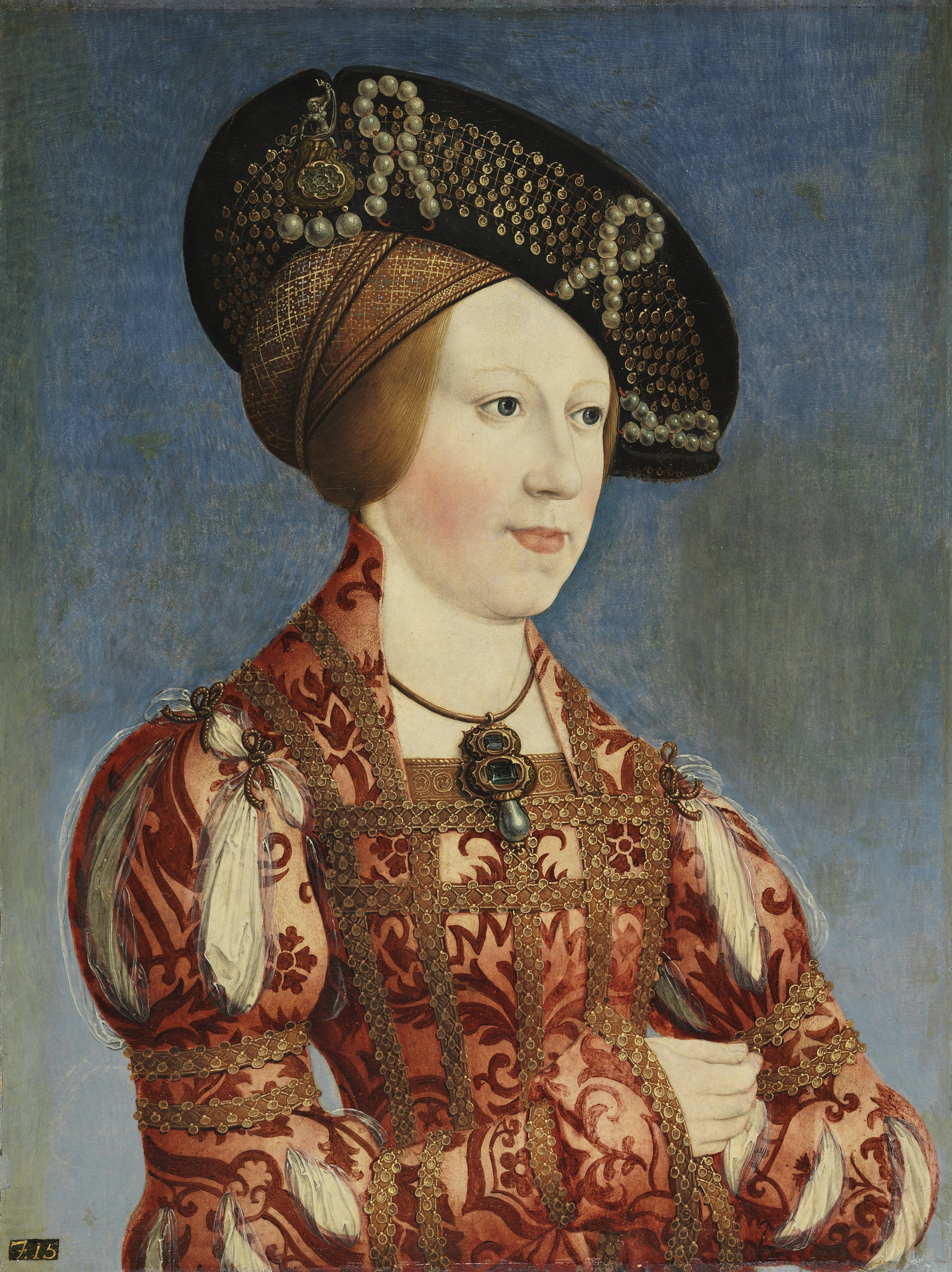
- Portrait by Hans Maler, c. 1519

Queen of the Romans
- Tenure: 5 January 1531 – 27 January 1547

Queen consort of Hungary, Bohemia and Croatia
- Tenure: 1526 – 27 January 1547

Archduchess consort of Austria
- Tenure: 25 May 1521 – 27 January 1547
- Born: 23 July 1503; Buda, Kingdom of Hungary
- Died: 27 January 1547 (aged 43); Prague, Kingdom of Bohemia, Holy Roman Empire
- Burial: St. Vitus Cathedral
- Spouse: Ferdinand I, Holy Roman Emperor (m. 1521)
- Issue: Elizabeth, Queen of Poland; Maximilian II, Holy Roman Emperor; Anna, Duchess of Bavaria; Ferdinand II, Archduke of Further Austria; Maria, Duchess of Jülich-Cleves-Berg; Archduchess Magdalena of Austria; Catherine, Queen of Poland; Eleanor, Duchess of Mantua; Archduchess Margaret of Austria; Archduke John of Austria; Barbara, Duchess of Ferrara; Charles II, Archduke of Inner Austria; Archduchess Ursula of Austria; Archduchess Helena of Austria; Joanna, Grand Duchess of Tuscany
- House: Jagiellon
- Father: Vladislaus II of Hungary
- Mother: Anne of Foix

Anna of Bohemia and Hungary (23 July 1503 – 27 January 1547), sometimes known as Anna Jagellonica, was Queen of Germany, Bohemia, and Hungary and Archduchess of Austria as the wife of King Ferdinand I (later Holy Roman Emperor).

The premature death of her father King Vladislaus had left Anne and her brother Louis in the care of the Holy Roman Emperor Maximilian I, who had Anne married to his second grandson, Ferdinand, who would become Ferdinand I, Holy Roman Emperor, after her death. Following her marriage, Anna moved to Vienna and enjoyed a good relationship with her husband and her sister-in-law, Queen Mary of Hungary.

The seventeen year old Anne and her new husband would go on to have many children, including the next Holy Roman Emperor, two Queens of Poland, several Archdukes of Austria, and a Grand Duchess of Tuscany. Ferdinand also allowed her a great deal of political influence, and presiding over many imperial diets. She was later famed for her charity and wisdom.

Anna died giving birth to her daughter Joanna at the age of 43, with Ferdinand never remarrying. He would become Holy Roman Emperor nearly a decade after Anna's death.

== Early life ==
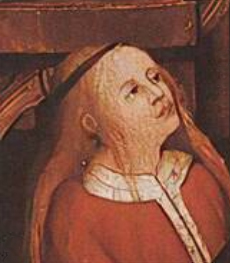
Anna as a girl (ca. 1511/1515) detail from painting by Bernhard Strigel

She was the oldest child and daughter of King Vladislaus II of Bohemia and Hungary (1456–1516) and his third wife Anne of Foix. King Louis II of Hungary and Bohemia was her younger brother. Her paternal grandparents were King Casimir IV of Poland (of the Jagiellon dynasty) and Elisabeth of Austria, one of the heiresses of the Kingdom of Bohemia, the Duchy of Luxembourg and the Duchy of Kuyavia. Her maternal grandparents were Gaston, Count of Candale, and Catherine of Foix, an Infanta of the Kingdom of Navarre.

Anna was born in Buda (now Budapest). The death of Vladislaus II on 13 March 1516 left both siblings in the care of the Holy Roman Emperor Maximilan I. At the same time that her brother Louis was married to Maximilian's granddaughter Mary of Austria in 1515, Anna was betrothed to an as yet unspecified brother of Mary, with Emperor Maximilian acting as proxy. Due to their age, it was decided that the newly married couple would not live together for a few more years.

Anna eventually married Mary's brother, Emperor Maximilian's grandson Archduke Ferdinand of Austria, second son of Queen Regnant Joanna of Castile and her late husband and co-ruler, Philip I of Castile. She moved to Vienna, where the double sisters-in-law were educated together until 1516, and then to Innsbruck. Maximilian rarely visited, but he sent his hunter home to instruct the two girls in the art of hunting. There was emphasis on their ability to handle weapons and other physical skills. The humanist education they enjoyed focused on problem-solving skills. They were also instructed in dancing, music, and came in contact with many humanists who visited the imperial library there. Innsbruck was also home to a great weapon arsenal and a growing armament industry built by the emperor.

== Marriage ==
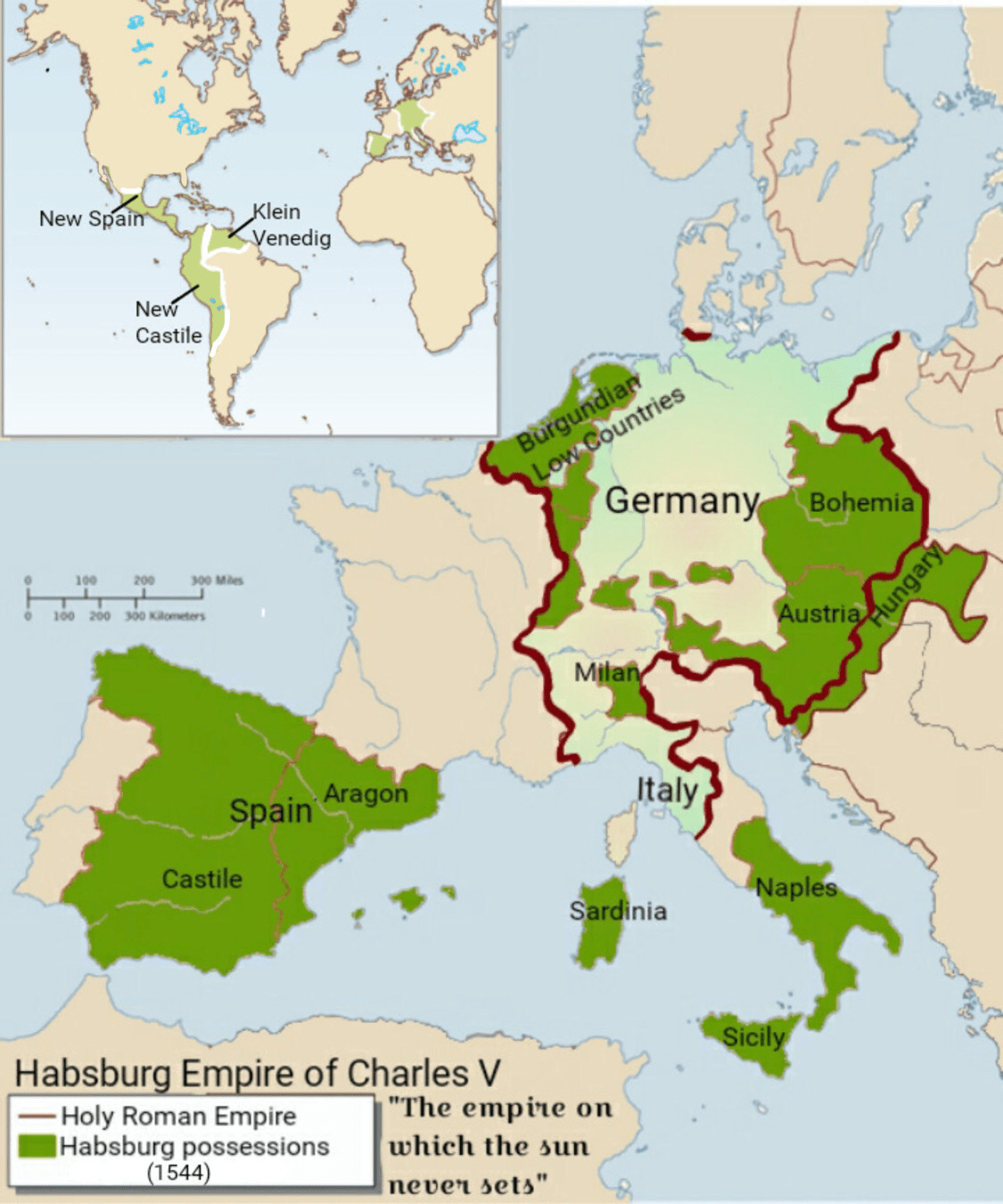
Habsburg lands in 1544. Anne's husband Ferdinand ruled the Austrian hereditary lands of the Habsburgs in the name of his elder brother, Charles I of Spain.

Anna married Ferdinand on 26 May 1521 in Linz, Austria. At the time, Ferdinand was governing the Habsburg hereditary lands on behalf of his older brother Charles V, Holy Roman Emperor. It was stipulated that Ferdinand should succeed Anne's brother Louis in case he died without legitimate male heirs.

It would, however, take more than five years before Anna became pregnant. Anna herself would ascribe her pregnancy to the grace of God. She gave birth to their first child, Elisabeth, in 1526.

== Queen of Bohemia and Hungary ==
Louis died without a legitimate male heir after he was thrown from his horse at the conclusion of the Battle of Mohács against Suleiman the Magnificent of the Ottoman Empire on 29 August 1526. This left the thrones of both Bohemia and Hungary vacant. Ferdinand claimed both kingdoms and was elected king of Bohemia on 24 October of the same year with Anne as his queen.

Hungary was a more difficult case, as Suleiman had annexed much of its lands. Ferdinand was proclaimed king of Hungary by a group of nobles, but another faction of Hungarian nobles refused to allow a foreign ruler to hold that title and elected John Zápolya as an alternative king. The resulting conflict between the two rivals and their successors lasted until 1570 when John's son John Sigismund gave up the title king of Hungary in favor of Ferdinand's son Maximilian as part of the terms of the Treaty of Speyer. In 1531, Ferdinand's older brother Charles V decided Ferdinand would be his successor as Holy Roman Emperor, and Ferdinand was elected to the title King of the Romans.

Anne was entrusted by her husband with many responsibilities. During his stay in Brussels, she was appointed as Regent (Statthalterin). Together with the Bishop of Trieste, she was the Chair of his Hofrat (Court Council). In her husband's name, she presided over many Diets. She became famous for her charity and wisdom.

Ferdinand at first seemed to suffer from a lack of premarital experience, but in the end the marriage proved extremely successful both personally and politically. Anna and Ferdinand had fifteen children, all of whom were born in Bohemia or Austria. The kingdoms of both Bohemia and Hungary had suffered for centuries from premature deaths among heirs and a shortage of succession prospects, a predicament resolved by Anne's impressive fertility. Meanwhile, Anna served as Queen Consort of Bohemia and as one of three living Queens of Hungary until her death.

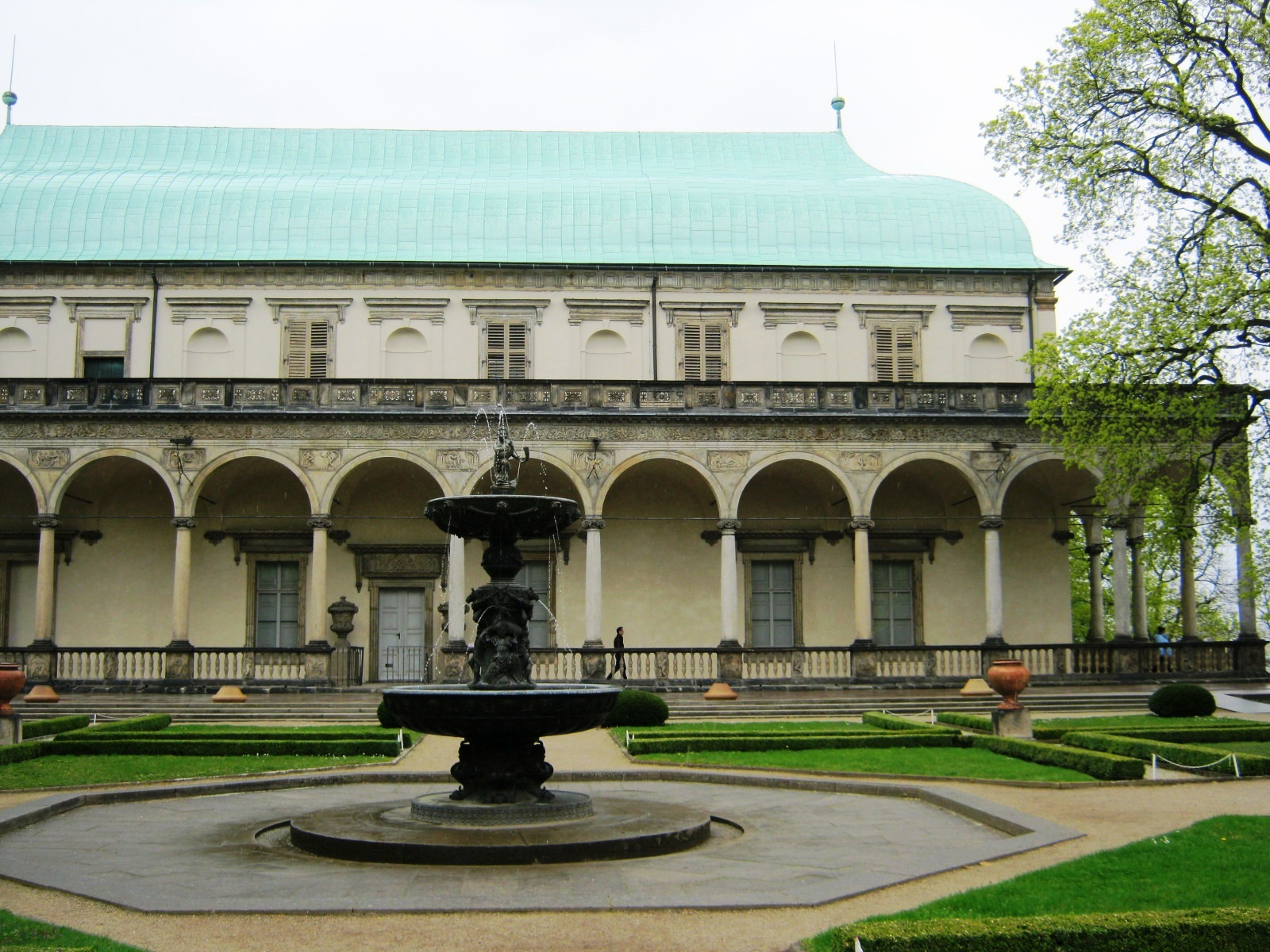
Queen Anne's Summer Palace in Prague

Anna died in Prague, days after giving birth to her last daughter, Joanna. In 1556, Charles V abdicated and Ferdinand succeeded as emperor, nine years after Anna's death. After Anna died, Ferdinand was advised to remarry several times by people around him, but he could not forget his wife and never remarried. During Anna's life, her husband expanded the Castle of Linz to offer her more security in times of war. The Belvedere ("Queen Anne's Summer Palace"), one of the most beautiful buildings in Prague, was built for her on the grounds of Prague Castle starting in 1538. It was not completed in its present form until 1565, long after her death.

== Children ==
Name	Birth	Death	Notes
Elisabeth	9 July 1526	15 June 1545	Married the future King of Poland and Grand Duke of Lithuania Sigismund II Augustus; no issue
Maximilian	31 July 1527	12 October 1576	Married his first cousin Maria of Spain; had issue
Anna	7 July 1528	16–17 October 1590	Married Albert V, Duke of Bavaria; had issue
Ferdinand	14 June 1529	24 January 1595	Married Philippine Welser; had issue; married his niece Anne Juliana Gonzaga; had issue
Maria	15 May 1531	11 December 1581	Married Wilhelm, Duke of Jülich-Cleves-Berg; had issue
Magdalena	14 August 1532	10 September 1590	A nun
Catherine	15 September 1533	28 February 1572	Married King of Poland and Grand Duke of Lithuania Sigismund II Augustus; no issue
Eleanor	2 November 1534	5 August 1594	Married William I, Duke of Mantua; had issue
Margaret	16 February 1536	12 March 1567	A nun
John	10 April 1538	20 March 1539	Died in childhood
Barbara	30 April 1539	19 September 1572	Married Alfonso II d'Este; no issue
Charles	3 June 1540	10 July 1590	Married his niece Maria Anna of Bavaria; had issue (including Holy Roman Emperor Ferdinand II)
Ursula	24 July 1541	30 April 1543	Died in childhood
Helena	7 January 1543	5 March 1574	A nun
Joanna	24 January 1547	10 April 1578	Married Francesco I de' Medici, Grand Duke of Tuscany; had issue

== Titles ==
The full titulature of Anne due to her marriage to Ferdinand Archduke of Austria and also due to her ancestry from Frankish, German, and Central and Eastern European aristocracy and royalty

"Her Imperial and Royal Apostolic Majesty, Anne Jagellonica, by the Grace of God, Queen & Empress Consort of the Romans, Queen Consort of Germany, Queen Consort of Hungary, of Bohemia, of Dalmatia, of Croatia, of Slavonia, of Galicia, of Lodomeria, of Italy, of Cumania, of Bulgaria, of Serbia, Rama, Romania, Queen Consort of Jerusalem, etc. etc.; Archduchess Consort of Austria; Duchess Consort of Burgundy, of Styria, of Carinthia and of Carniola; Grand Princess Consort of Transylvania; Margravine Consort of Moravia; Duchess Consort of Brabant, of Limburg, of Luxemburg, of Guelders, of Württemberg, of Upper and Lower Silesia, of Milan, of Mantua, of Modena, of Parma, of Piacenza, of Guastalla, of Auschwitz and of Zator, of Teschen, Friaul, Ragusa, Zara and Teck; Princess Consort of Swabia; Princely Countess Consort of Habsburg, of Flanders, of Tyrol, of Hainault, of Kyburg, of Gorizia and of Gradisca; Princess Consort of Trento and Brixen; Margravine Consort of Burgau, of Upper and Lower Lusatia, Istria; Countess Consort of Hohenems, of Namur, Feldkirch, Bregenz, Sonnenberg, etc. etc.; Countess Consort of Namur; Lady Consort of Trieste, of Cattaro and on the Wendish Mark and of Mechlin; Duchess Consort of Lorraine and Bar, Grand Duchess Consort of Tuscany; Grand Voivode Consort of the Voivodeship of Serbia, etc. etc."

== Ancestry ==
Ancestors of Anna of Bohemia and Hungary

8. Vladislaus II Jagiellon
4. Casimir IV Jagiellon
9. Sophia of Halshany
2. Vladislaus II of Bohemia and Hungary
10. Albert II, King of the Romans
5. Elisabeth of Austria
11. Elizabeth of Luxembourg
1. Anne of Bohemia and Hungary
12. John de Foix, 1st Earl of Kendal
6. Gaston, Count of Candale
13. Margaret Kerdeston
3. Anne of Foix
14. Gaston IV, Count of Foix
7. Catherine of Foix
15. Eleanor of Navarre

== Sources ==
- Henry Gardiner Adams, ed. (1857). "Anna of Hungary" . A Cyclopaedia of Female Biography: 45. Wikidata Q115749214 – via Wikisource.
- Previte-Orton, C.W. (1962). The Shorter Cambridge Medieval History. Vol. II. Cambridge at the University Press.

Anna of Bohemia and Hungary House of Jagiellon Cadet branch of the House of Gediminid Born: 23 July 1503 Died: 27 January 1547
Royal titles
Preceded by Mary of Austria	Queen consort of Bohemia; Queen consort of Hungary and Croatia; 1526–1547	Vacant Title next held by Maria of Austria
Preceded by Isabella of Portugal	Queen of the Romans; 1531–1547 with Isabella of Portugal (1531–1539)	Vacant Title next held by Maria of Austria
Preceded by Isabella of Portugal	Archduchess consort of Austria; 1521–1547	Vacant Title next held by Maria of Austria
