= 1531 imperial election =

Holy Roman Empire election of

- 5 January 1531

6 Prince-electors (Note: John, Elector of Saxony, the seventh elector, boycotted the election in protest of Ferdinand's candidacy and the Habsburgs' religious policies, refusing to recognize the legality of the proceedings.) 4 votes needed to win
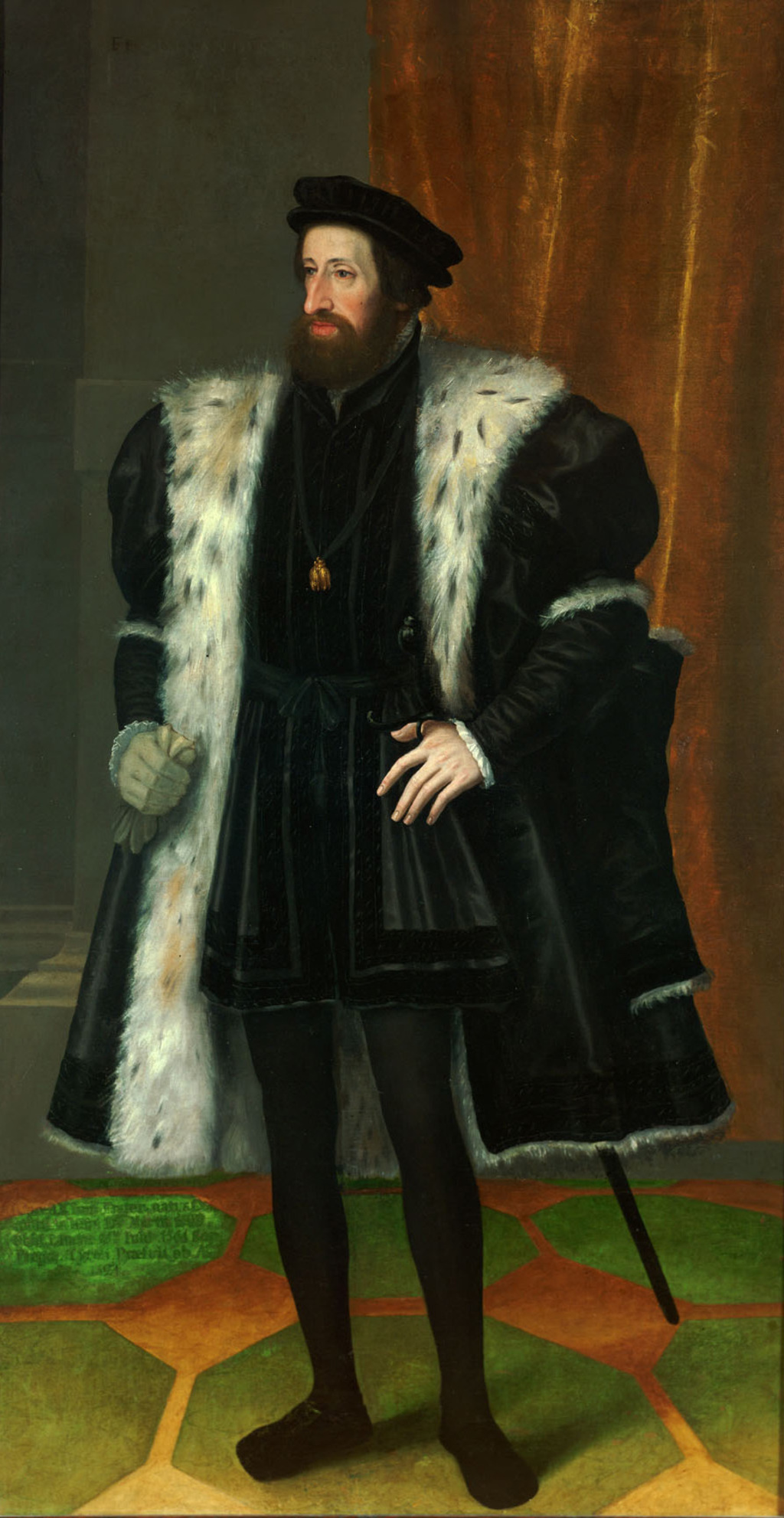
Candidate	Ferdinand I
House	Habsburg
Electoral vote	6
Percentage	100%
Emperor before election
Charles V
House of Habsburg
Elected Emperor (Note: Ferdinand was elected as King of the Romans to act as Charles V's designated successor and co-ruler in Germany. He became Emperor when Charles abdicated in 1558.)
Ferdinand I
House of Habsburg

An imperial election was held in Cologne on 5 January 1531 to select the King of the Romans of the Holy Roman Empire. As the current emperor, Charles V, had not yet died nor abdicated, this election was conducted so as to determine his successor.

== Background ==
This was the second imperial election to take place during the Reformation. On 31 October 1517 Martin Luther, a professor of moral theology at the University of Wittenberg, now part of the Martin Luther University of Halle-Wittenberg, had delivered the Ninety-five Theses to Albert of Brandenburg, the Archbishop-Elector of Mainz. This list of propositions criticized the practice of selling indulgences, remissions of the punishment meted out for sin in Purgatory. Luther's criticism snowballed into a massive schism in the church. In 1527, John, Elector of Saxony, established a Lutheran state church in Saxony with the elector as chief bishop.

The Holy Roman Emperor Charles V, Holy Roman Emperor called for the election of his successor. The prince-electors called to Cologne for this occasion were:

- Albert of Brandenburg, Archbishop-Elector of Mainz
- Richard von Greiffenklau zu Vollrads, Archbishop-Elector of Trier
- Hermann of Wied, Archbishop-Elector of Cologne
- Ferdinand, younger brother of Charles and King of Bohemia
- Louis V, Elector of the Electoral Palatinate
- John, Elector of Saxony
- Joachim I Nestor, Elector of Brandenburg

John remained the only Protestant. Hermann, though a bishop, showed reforming tendencies, and would eventually be deposed from his episcopate in 1546. The remaining electors were strongly pro-Catholic.

Charles had called the election by the terms of the Habsburg compact of 1521-1522 signed with his younger brother Ferdinand, according to which he was expected to call for an imperial election after he was crowned by the pope. The coronation took place in 1530, and Charles convoked the seven princes to elect Ferdinand.

== Election and aftermath ==
Ferdinand was elected King of the Romans in the city of Cologne. Charles continued to be Holy Roman Emperor for over 25 years. By 1550, he regretted the election as he realized that it would have led to the division of the House of Austria between his son Philip II of Spain and Ferdinand. He therefore contracted with his family in 1551 that Philip was the successor of Ferdinand. Charles also tried to arrange political marriages to maintain the unity of the Habsburgs.

However, Charles V abdicated on 27 August 1556. The Imperial Diet accepted his abdication on 3 May 1558. Ferdinand was crowned at Frankfurt. Ferdinand was succeeded not by his nephew Philip, but by his own son Maximilian, who was chosen during Ferdinand's reign in the imperial election of 1562. The electors, fearing the instability that would have resulted in having an absentee Spanish-speaking emperor born in Valladolid, had lobbied instead for Maximilian.
