= Archduchess Magdalena of Austria =

Habsburg noble and abbess (1532–1590)

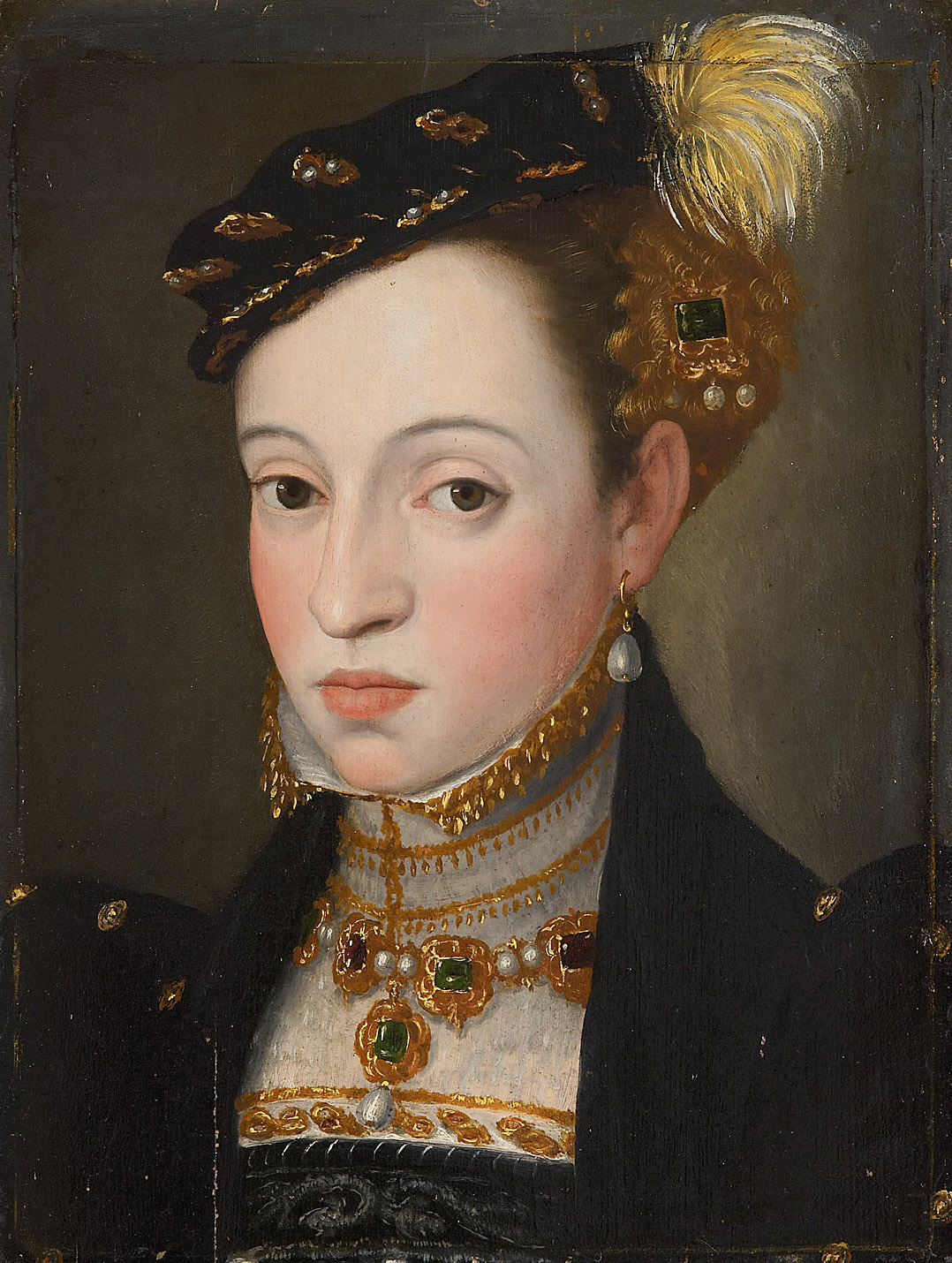
- By Giuseppe Arcimboldo c. 1563
- Born: 14 August 1532; Innsbruck, County of Tyrol, Holy Roman Empire
- Died: 10 September 1590 (aged 58); Hall in Tirol, County of Tyrol, Holy Roman Empire
- House: House of Habsburg
- Father: Ferdinand I, Holy Roman Emperor
- Mother: Anne of Bohemia and Hungary
- Religion: Roman Catholic

Magdalena of Austria (German: Magdalena von Österreich; 14 August 1532 – 10 September 1590) was a co-founder and first abbess of the Ladies' Convent of Hall (Haller Damenstift), born an archduchess of Austria from the House of Habsburg as the daughter of Ferdinand I, Holy Roman Emperor. She is a Venerable in the Catholic Church.

== Life ==
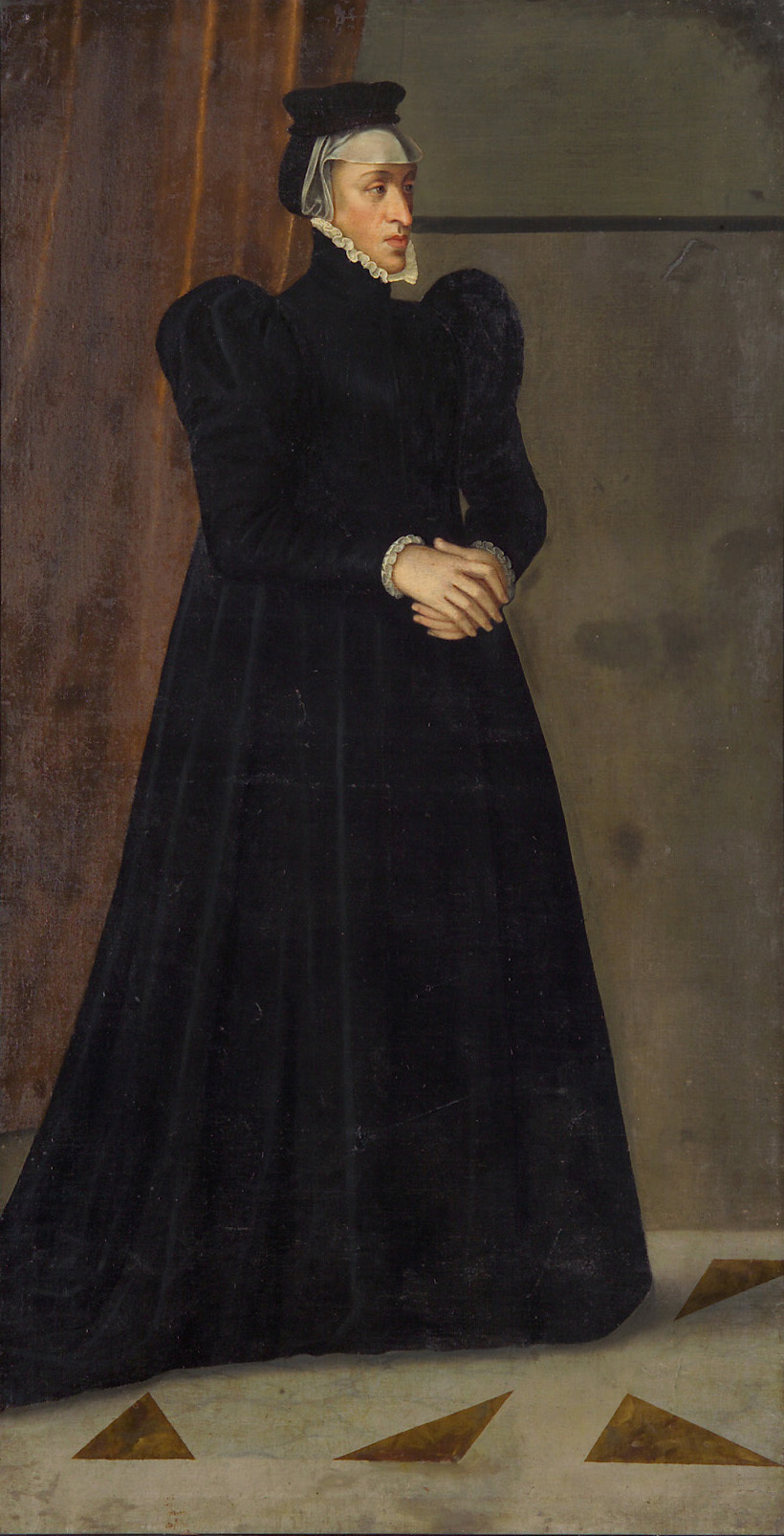
Archduchess Magdalena as a nun, by Francesco Terzi, c. 1564-1568

=== Early life ===
Archduchess Magdalena of Austria was born on 14 August 1531 as the sixth child and fourth daughter of Ferdinand I, Holy Roman Emperor (1503–1564) and his wife, born Princess Anne of Bohemia and Hungary (1503–1547). She had a strict, religious upbringing with a heavy influence from Jesuits.

=== Life as an abbess ===
Archduchess Magdalena and her younger sister Margaret had long expressed a desire to remain unmarried and create a community of pious women, which their father had a difficult time accepting. After his death in 1564, Magdalena took a vow of celibacy and founded the Ladies' Convent of Hall (Haller Damenstift) in Hall in Tirol, County of Tyrol, a place for like-minded women to lead a reclusive, pious and God-fearing lives under the supervision of the Society of Jesus.

She became the first abbess of the new convent where she was joined by her younger sisters Archduchesses Margaret (1536–1567) and Archduchess Helena of Austria (1543–1574). Magdalena died on 10 September 1590 at the age of 58 after a short sickness. She was buried in the Jesuit Church (Jesuitenkirche) in Hall in Tirol. In 1706, her remains were transferred to the church of the convent.

== Veneration ==
Magdalena's cause was formally opened on 23 August 1905, granting her the title of Servant of God. Her spiritual writings were approved by theologians on 10 June 1914. She was later granted the title of Venerable.

== Ancestors ==
Ancestors of Archduchess Magdalena of Austria

8. Maximilian I, Holy Roman Emperor
4. Philip I of Castile
9. Mary, Duchess of Burgundy
2. Ferdinand I, Holy Roman Emperor
10. Ferdinand II of Aragon
5. Joanna I of Castile
11. Isabella I of Castile
1. Archduchess Magdalena of Austria
12. Casimir IV Jagiellon
6. Vladislaus II of Bohemia and Hungary
13. Elisabeth of Austria
3. Anne of Bohemia and Hungary
14. Gaston de Foix, Count of Candale
7. Anne of Foix-Candale
15. Catherine of Foix
