= 1562 imperial election =

- 28 November 1562

7 Prince-electors 4 votes needed to win
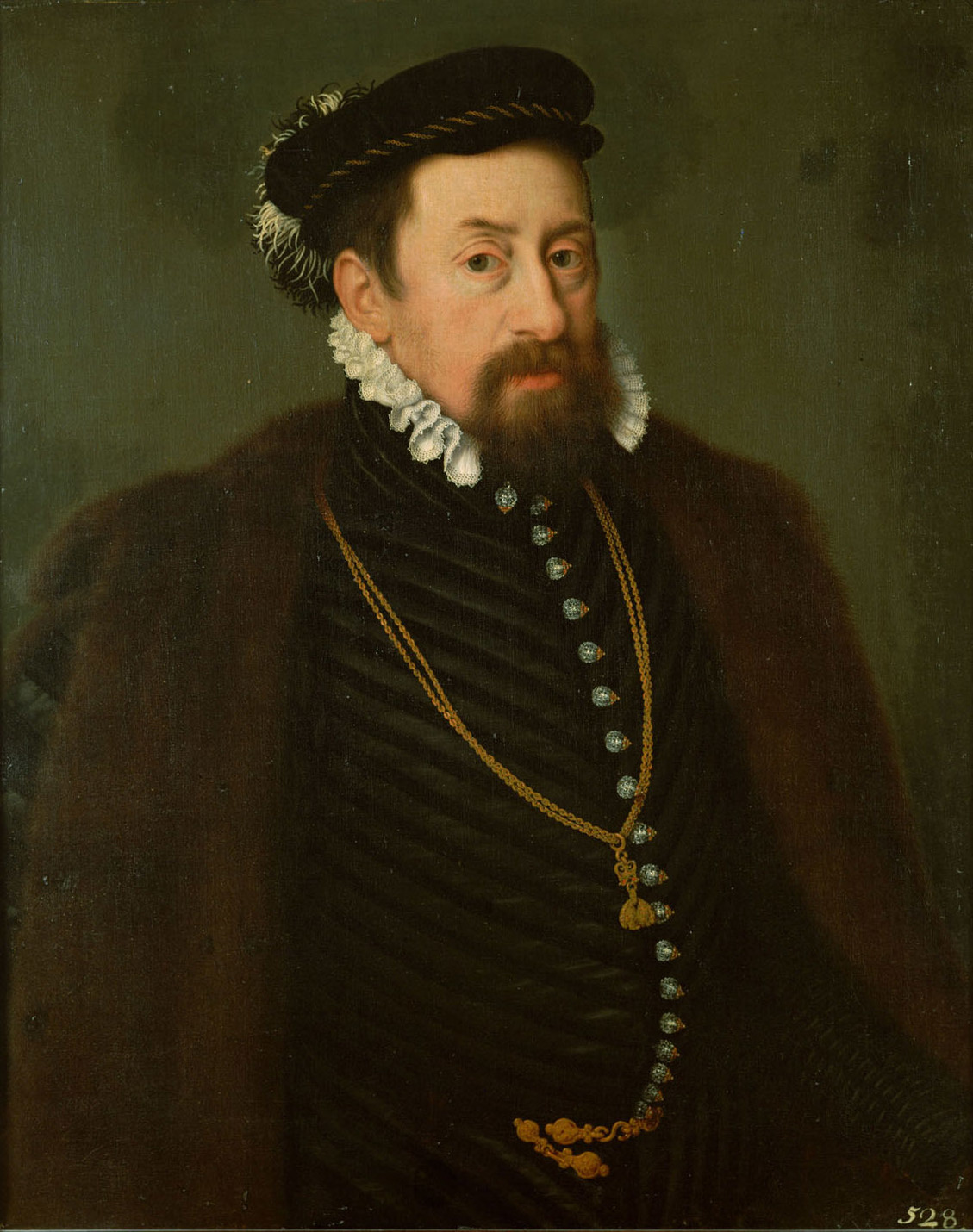
Candidate	Maximilian II
House	Habsburg
Electoral vote	7
Percentage	100%
Emperor before election
Ferdinand I
House of Habsburg
Elected Emperor (Note: Maximilian was elected as King of the Romans to act as Ferdinand I's designated successor and co-ruler. He became Emperor upon his father's death in 1564.)
Maximilian II
House of Habsburg

An imperial election was held in Frankfurt on 28 November 1562 to select the emperor of the Holy Roman Empire.

== Background ==
This was the third imperial election to take place during the Reformation. On 31 October 1517, Martin Luther, a professor of moral theology at the University of Wittenberg, now part of the Martin Luther University of Halle-Wittenberg, had delivered the Ninety-five Theses to Albert of Brandenburg, the elector of Mainz. This list of propositions criticized the practice of selling indulgences, remissions of the punishment meted out for sin in Purgatory.

=== Schmalkaldic War ===
Luther's criticism snowballed into a massive schism in the church, and from there into a split among the states of the empire. In 1527, John, Elector of Saxony, established a Lutheran state church in Saxony with the elector as chief bishop. On 27 February 1531, John joined Philip I, Landgrave of Hesse, in establishing the Schmalkaldic League, a defensive military alliance of Lutheran principalities in which each pledged to support the other in the event of an attack by the forces of the Catholic Charles V, Holy Roman Emperor. In time Anhalt, Württemberg, Pomerania, Augsburg, Frankfurt, Kempten, Brandenburg and the Electoral Palatinate were added to the League.

In view of the preparations of the Emperor Charles V to suppress them, the members of the League launched a pre-emptive attack on his forces at the Catholic city of Füssen on 10 July 1546. The ensuing war led to the defeat and dissolution of the Schmalkaldic League. It led also to the 1547 Capitulation of Wittenberg, according to which John Frederick I, Elector of Saxony was compelled to cede the electorate to his cousin Maurice, Elector of Saxony, the first member of the Albertine branch of the House of Wettin to hold it.

=== Cuius regio, eius religio ===
On 15 May 1548, Charles issued the Augsburg Interim. Intended as a compromise between the Catholic empire and its Protestant princes and subjects, it permitted the marriage of Protestant clergy and the receipt by the laity of communion under both kinds. However, it also ordered the readoption among Protestants of Catholic practices including the seven sacraments. Domestic pressure from the Protestant subjects of the empire led to the offer of additional concessions in the Leipzig Interim in December, and finally to more violence. On 15 January 1552, a coalition of Protestant princes of the Holy Roman Empire signed the Treaty of Chambord with King Henry II of France, inviting him to occupy the Three Bishoprics of Metz, Verdun and Toul in exchange for military assistance against Charles. The renewed conflict was ended by the Peace of Passau of August 1552, which revoked the Augsburg Interim, and by the Peace of Augsburg of September 1555, which permitted princes of the empire to establish Lutheranism or Catholicism as their state religions.

=== Election of 1562 ===
Charles was succeeded by his brother Ferdinand I, Holy Roman Emperor upon his official abdication in 1558. Ferdinand called for the election of his successor. As king of Bohemia, he held one vote. The remaining electors were:

- Daniel Brendel von Homburg, elector of Mainz
- Johann von der Leyen, elector of Trier
- Friedrich IV of Wied, elector of Cologne
- Frederick III, elector of the Electoral Palatinate
- Augustus, elector of Saxony
- Joachim II Hector, elector of Brandenburg

== Elected ==
Ferdinand's son Maximilian II, Holy Roman Emperor was elected as king of the Romans.

== Aftermath ==
Maximilian acceded to the throne on his father's death on 25 July 1564.
