= Archduchess Margaret of Austria (1536–1567) =

Archduchess of Austria

Margaret of Austria
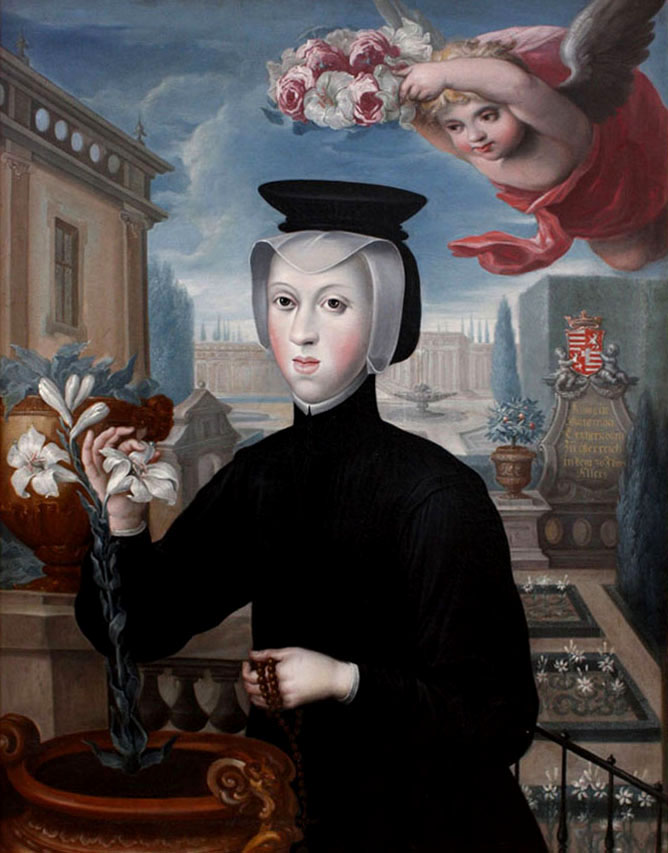
- Born: 16 February 1536; Innsbruck, County of Tyrol, Holy Roman Empire
- Died: 12 March 1567 (aged 31); Hall in Tirol, County of Tyrol, Holy Roman Empire
- House: House of Habsburg
- Father: Ferdinand I, Holy Roman Emperor
- Mother: Anne of Bohemia and Hungary

Margaret of Austria (German: Margarethe von Österreich; 16 February 1536 – 12 March 1567) was a co-founder of the Ladies' Convent of Hall (Haller Damenstift), born an archduchess of Austria from the House of Habsburg as the daughter of Ferdinand I, Holy Roman Emperor.

== Life ==
=== Early life ===
Archduchess Margaret of Austria was born in Innsbruck, County of Tyrol (in present-day Austria) on 16 February 1536 as the ninth child and seventh daughter of Ferdinand I, Holy Roman Emperor (1503–1564) and his wife, born Princess Anna of Bohemia and Hungary (1503–1547). She had a strict, religious upbringing with a heavy influence from Jesuits.

=== Life as a nun ===
Margaret and her older sister Archduchess Magdalena of Austria had long expressed a desire to remain unmarried and create a community of pious women, which their father had a difficult time accepting. After his death in 1564 they both became nuns in Hall in Tirol, County of Tyrol, founding the Ladies' Convent of Hall (Haller Damenstift) under the supervision of the Society of Jesus with her sisters Archduchesses Magdalena (1532–1590) and Helena (1543–1574) of Austria. She died there on 12 March 1567 at the age of 31.
