= Archduchess Helena of Austria (1543–1574) =

Austrian archduchess and nun (1543–1574)

Helena of Austria
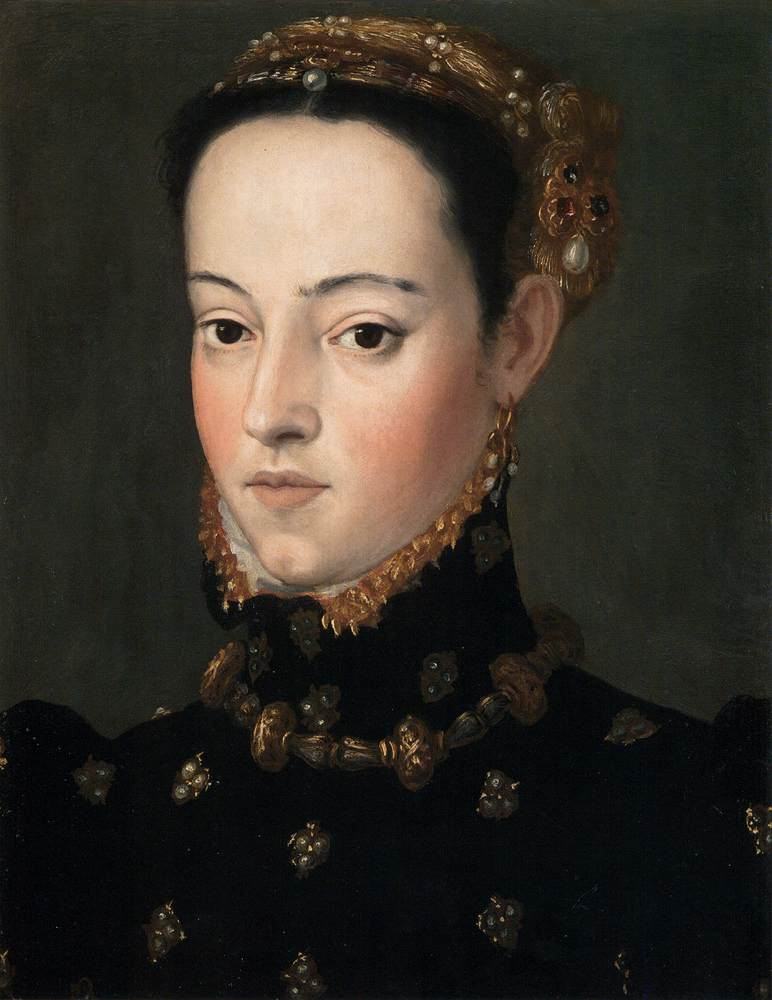
- Bust of a daughter of Ferdinand I (presumed to be of Helena) by Giuseppe Arcimboldo
- Born: 7 January 1543; Vienna, Archduchy of Austria, Holy Roman Empire
- Died: 5 March 1574 (aged 31); Hall in Tirol, County of Tyrol, Holy Roman Empire
- House: House of Habsburg
- Father: Ferdinand I, Holy Roman Emperor
- Mother: Anne of Bohemia and Hungary

Helena of Austria (German: Helena von Österreich; 7 January 1543 – 5 March 1574) was a co-founder of the Ladies' Convent of Hall (Haller Damenstift), born an archduchess of Austria from the House of Habsburg as the daughter of Ferdinand I, Holy Roman Emperor.

== Life ==
=== Early life ===
Archduchess Helena of Austria was born in Vienna in the Archduchy of Austria on 7 January 1543 as the fourteenth child and tenth daughter of Ferdinand I, Holy Roman Emperor (1503–1564) and his wife, born Princess Anna of Bohemia and Hungary (1503–1547). She had a strict, religious upbringing with a heavy influence from Jesuits.

=== Life as a nun ===
Due to her frail health, her father considered her unfit for marriage, so she became a nun in Hall in Tirol, County of Tyrol, founding the Ladies' Convent of Hall (Haller Damenstift) under the supervision of the Society of Jesus with her older sisters Archduchesses Magdalena (1532–1590) and Margaret (1536–1567) of Austria. She died there on 5 March 1574 at the age of 31, and was buried in the local Jesuit Church (Jesuitenkirche).
