= Francesco Terzi =

Italian painter

Francesco Terzio, or Francesco Terzi (ca. 1523 – 20 August 1591) was an Italian painter of the Renaissance period. He was born in Bergamo. He was a pupil of Giovanni Battista Moroni. He painted two pictures a Nativity, and an Assumption of the Virgin for San Francesco, in Bergamo.

Around 1550, Terzio received commissions from the circle of Emperor Charles V, and his monogram appears on a portrait of Charles V at age 50. Following Charles's death in 1558, Terzio continued to work in Austria, where he served as court painter to his sons, Emperor Maximilian II in Vienna and Archduke Ferdinand II of Austria in Innsbruck. He contributed to various large-scale projects celebrating the history and genealogy of the House of Habsburg, designing 74 engravings illustrating the Imagines Gentis Austriacae and painting several full-length portraits of members of the Habsburg family, including official portraits of Ferdinand II.

Terzio spent the greater part of his life in Austria but died in Rome.
