= Janus Cornarius =

German physician and philologist (c.1500–1558)

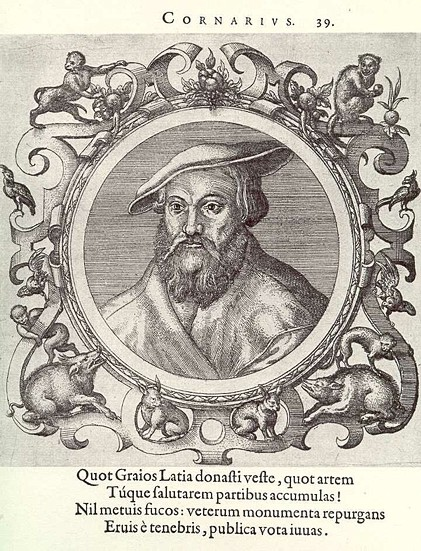

Janus Cornarius (ca. 1500 – 16 March 1558) was a Saxon humanist and friend of Erasmus. A gifted philologist, Cornarius specialized in editing and translating Greek and Latin medical writers with "prodigious industry," taking a particular interest in botanical pharmacology and the effects of environment on illness and the body. Early in his career, Cornarius also worked with Greek poetry, and later in his life Greek philosophy; he was, in the words of Friedrich August Wolf, "a great lover of the Greeks." Patristic texts of the 4th century were another of his interests. Some of his own writing is extant, including a book on the causes of plague and a collection of lectures for medical students.

== Life and career ==
Details of the life of Cornarius are taken in large part from the Latin biography by Melchior Adam in Vitae Germanorum medicorum ("Lives of German Physicians," 1620). Cornarius was born Johann or Johannes Hainpol, the son of a shoemaker, but adopted his fashionably Latinized name by the time he reached age 20. The toponymic Zuiccaulensis ("of Zwickau") is sometimes added. His name may appear as Giovanni Cornario in Italian, Jano Cornario in Spanish, Jean Cornario in French, and Janus Kornar in German.

Cornarius began his education at the Latin school in his native Zwickau. He studied with Petrus Mosellanus at Leipzig, matriculating in 1517 and earning a bachelor of arts degree in 1518. He enrolled at the University of Wittenberg in 1519, where he earned a master's degree (1521) and a license in medicine (1523). He thus would have been at Wittenberg when the Zwickau Prophets, an anti-authoritarian Anabaptist movement from his place of birth, attempted to seize power in 1521. They were successfully opposed and rendered ineffective by Martin Luther in 1522. That Cornarius condemned the Anabaptists is clear from his later book on plague, in which he argued that a particular epidemic in Westphalia was sent as punishment from God for their heretical activities.

After experiencing these political and spiritual upheavals, Cornarius set out on a "soul-searching journey" around Europe, visiting Livonia, Sweden, Denmark, England, and France. While he was looking for work, he settled for a time in Basel, where he gave lectures on Greek medicine at the University of Basel. There he began his efforts to restore the study of the Greeks, whose works, he believed, had been neglected during the Middle Ages in favor of Arab medical authorities. In 1527–28, he was a physician to Prince Henry of Mecklenburg. Returning to Zwickau in 1530, he established a medical practice and married the first of his two wives; she died not long after. With his second wife, he had four sons. For the remainder of his life he was a physician and professor of medicine as well as a prolific editor and translator.

== Intellectual milieu ==
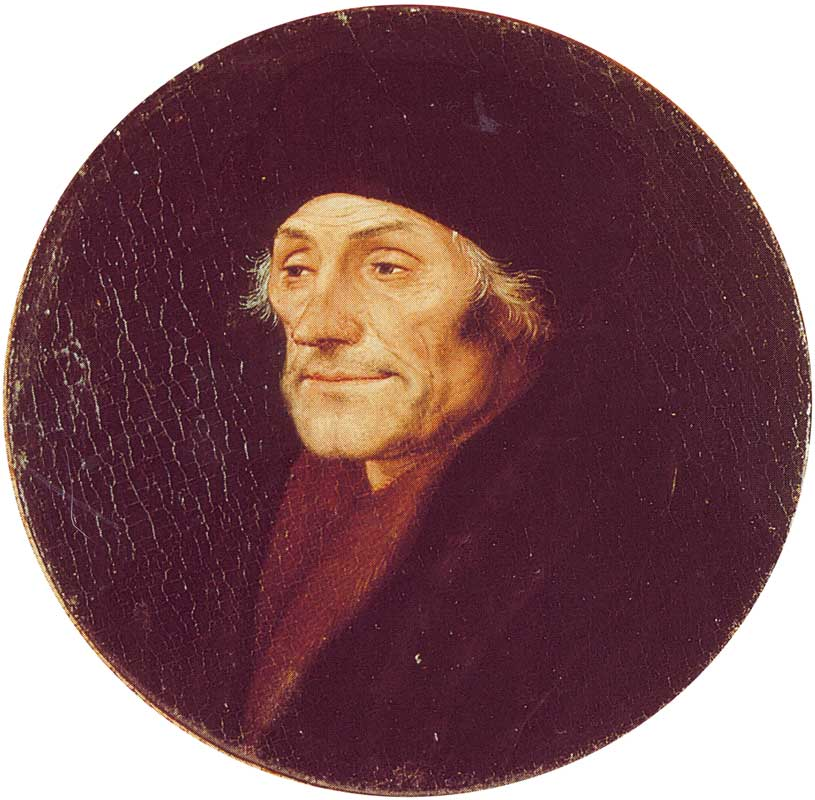
Erasmus

Cornarius came to know the great humanist Desiderius Erasmus while living in Basel, and was encouraged by him to persist with his work in translating Greek texts into Latin; at the time, ancient Greek was little known, but Latin was still in living use as an international language among scholars for such purposes as letter-writing, informational or philosophical essays, and even some literary compositions. Erasmus wrote to him around the time Cornarius was resettling in Zwickau, addressing him as ornatissime Cornari ("oh-so-refined Cornarius"). Of his translation of Hippocrates, Erasmus effused, "The genius is there; the erudition is there, the vigorous body and vital spirit are there; in sum, nothing is missing that was required for this assignment, confronted happily, it would seem, despite its difficulty." The junior philologist was so pleased by Erasmus's many compliments in this letter that sixteen years later he proudly quoted from it in the introduction to his Latin version of Hippocrates. At the same time, his intellectual independence is indicated by his willingness to set aside the translations of Basil and Galen made by Erasmus in favor of his own.

His work as a philologist was not merely academic or text-oriented, but animated by a commitment to teaching. Melchior Adam wrote that Cornarius "tried to render the Greek physicians into Latin with a translation that was not vague and confusing, but lucid and fully articulated." His goal, as Cornarius himself stated in his commentary on Dioscorides’ De materia medica, was first to read and hear the author in Greek, and then through translation to enable his medical students to hear and read him in Latin. A scholar of Byzantine studies took a more dismissive view of Cornarius as one of the "Renaissance humanists, fully confident that dissemination of a revered classical text would better mankind’s lot," motivated by "a contempt … for the brutish peasant and his slovenly practices."

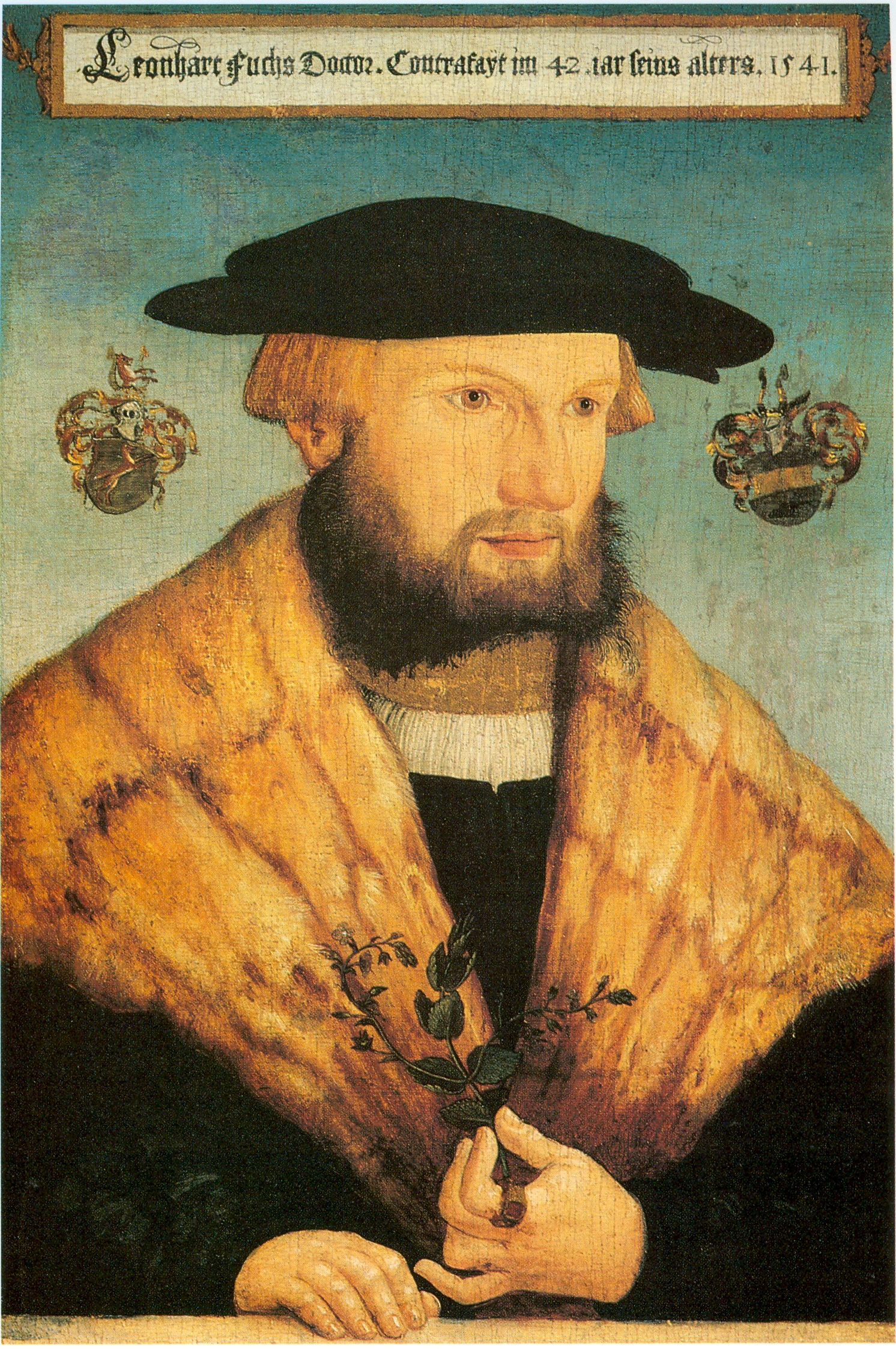
Leonhart Fuchs

Like the physician and botanist Leonhart Fuchs, Cornarius devoted himself to reviving and perpetuating the classical tradition, seeking to restore both the texts and practice of Greek medicine, which they felt had been eclipsed during the medieval era by Avicennism; Cornarius did not, however, reject the study of Arabic texts and seems to have known the language. While Fuchs approached Galen’s work on medicinal plants as a methodology, Cornarius, grounded in philology, believed Dioscorides’ knowledge of plants resided in accurately capturing the original author’s voice and words, and the two engaged in a vigorous intellectual debate over the value of illustrations in books. With his sometime collaborator Andrea Alciati, Cornarius treated the emblema or image as a verbal construct, and in his index to Dioscorides refers to his own verbal description of a plant as a pictura. In his commentary, Cornarius insisted that pictures were of no benefit to readers who had never seen a particular plant vivam et naturalem ("alive and in nature"), arguing that the static quality of an illustration was misleading, since plants change according to their environment. Thus he stated:

My intention is not to gorge the eyes, but to nourish the mind and spirit, and to quicken critical thinking.

== Works ==
The majority of Cornarius's books were published through the printing house of Hieronymus Froben and Nicolaus Episcopius. For a thorough overview (in French), see Brigitte Mondrain, "Éditer et traduire les médecins grecs au XVIe siècle: L'exemple de Janus Cornarius," in Les voies de la science grecque: Études sur la transmission des textes de l'Antiquité au dix-neuvième siècle, edited by Danielle Jacquart (Paris 1997), pp. 391–417.

Cornarius's complete works were listed on the Index Librorum Prohibitorum, an index of books prohibited by the Roman Catholic Church promulgated the year after his death. As in the case of several other northern Protestant scholars, general content or scientific controversy was less at issue than religious conviction. Writing that could be regarded as anti-Catholic was held to contaminate other works that might be in and of themselves unobjectionable.

Works are listed below in chronological order of publication, except that editions and translations from the same author are grouped.

- Universae rei medicae ἐπιγραφή ("Comprehensive Reference on the Subject of Medicine," Basel 1529), with a dedication to the citizens of Zwickau for their support during his seven years of study, also known as Epigraphe universae medicinae ("Comprehensive Reference on Medicine," Basel 1534), probably intended as the sort of CliffsNotes for medical students that Girolamo Mercuriale disdained.

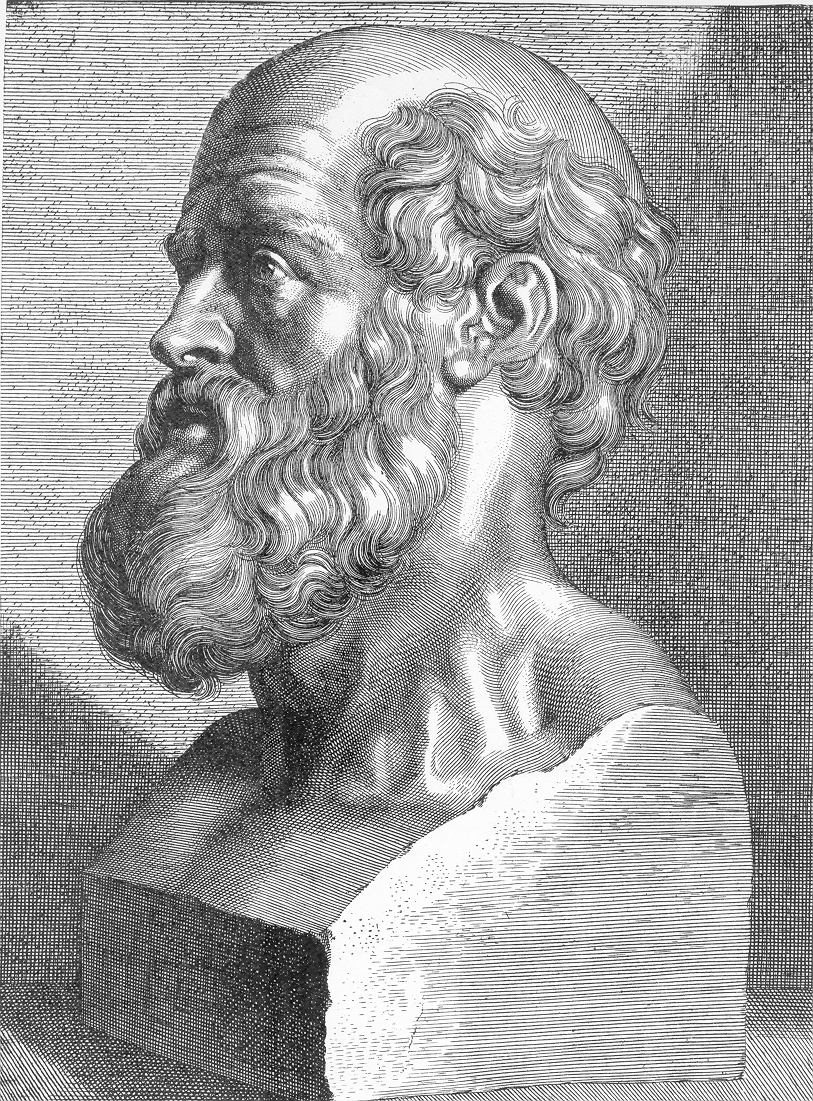
Hippocrates

- Hippocrates. ΙΠΠΟΚΡΑΤΟΥΣ ΠΕΡΙ ΑΕΡΩΝ ὙΔΑΤΩΝ ΤΟΠΩΝ. ΠΕΡΙ ΦΥΣΩΝ / Hippocratis Coi De aëre, aquis, & locis libellus. Eiusdem de flatibus ("Treatise by Hippocrates of Cos on Airs, Waters and Places, and also Winds"; Basel 1529), Greek text and Latin translation; ΙΠΠΟΚΡΑΤΟΥΣ ΚΩΟΥ ΙΑΤΡΟΥ ΠΑΛΑΙΟΤΑΤΟΥ … βιβλία ἅπαντα / Hippocratis Coi medici vetustissimi … libri omnes, ("Complete Works of Hippocrates of Cos, Most Ancient of Physicians," Basel 1538); Hippocratis Coi … Opera quae ad nos extant omnia ("The Extant Works of Hippocrates of Cos," Basel 1546), Latin translation. De salubri diaeta incerti auctoris liber Hippocrati quondam falso adscriptus ("A book of unknown authorship, at one time falsely ascribed to Hippocrates, on a healthy diet") was translated by Cornarius and reprinted in the Regimen sanitatis Salernitanum (Geneva 1591), pp. 403–410. The transmission of the Hippocratic Corpus is vexed and problematic; Cornarius contributed, albeit with limited success, to 16th-century efforts to "bring order to the chaos."

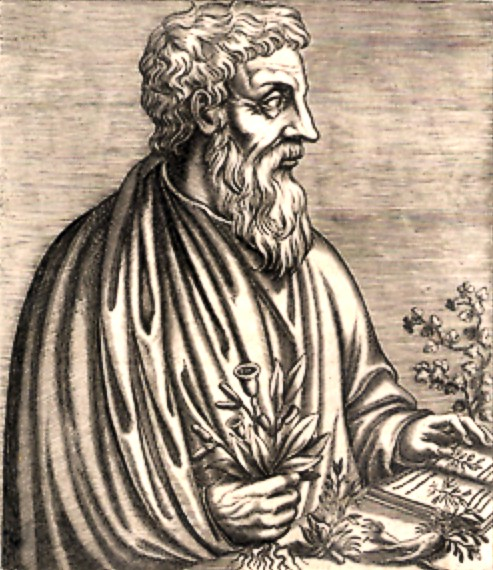
Dioscorides

- Dioscorides. ΔΙΟΣΚΟΡΙΔΗΣ ΙΑΝΟΥ ΤΟΥ ΚΟΡΝΑΡΙΟΥ ("The Diosorides of Janos Cornarios") / Pedacii Dioscoridis de materia medica libri sex ("Six Books by Pedacius Dioscorides on Pharmacology," Basel 1529), Greek edition. His Latin translation was published in 1557 as Pedacii Dioscoridae Anazarbensis De materia medica libri V ("The Five Books on Pharmacology by Pedacius Dioscorides of Anazarbus"), with Cornarius's emblema inserted into each chapter (singulis capitibus adiecta). The volume also contained his translation of Dioscorides' De bestiis venenum eiaculentibus, et letalibus medicamentis Libri II ("Two Books on Beasts that Produce Venom and on Potentially Fatal Drugs").
- Selecta Epigrammata Graeca Latine, ex Septem Epigrammatum Graecorum Libris ("Selected Greek Epigrams, Translated into Latin, from Seven Books of Greek Epigrams," Basel 1529), a compilation with Alciati, who was "not entirely happy" with the work of his collaborator. The collection, taken from the Greek Anthology, ranges from early classical love poems and gnomic verses to later Hellenistic invective. The translations and some freer imitations were by eminent Latinists of the day, including Ottmar Luscinius, Thomas More, William Lilye, Erasmus, Johannes Sleidanus, and Caspar Ursinus Velius. The collection served as a source for the translations or imitations of a number of poets, among them George Turbervile (in English) and Diego Hurtado de Mendoza (in Spanish).
- Parthenius. De amatoriis affectionibus liber ("Book on Erotic Feelings," Basel 1531); the copy that the 16th-century French poet Ronsard owned survives with the poet’s signature. Cornarius's publication of this translation coincides with the period of mourning for his first wife, who died soon after they were married.
- Aëtius Amidenus. Aëtii Amideni quem alii Antiochenum vocant medici clarissimi libri XVI, in tres tomos divisi ("Sixteen Books by Aëtius Amidenus, Whom Some Call the Most Distinguished Physician of Antioch, in Three Volumes"), vols. 1 and 3 translated into Latin by the physician Johannes Baptista Montanus of Verona (Basel 1535) and vol. 2 by Cornarius, De cognoscendis et curandis morbis sermones sex ("Six Lectures on Diagnosing and Treating Diseases," Basel 1533), along with a treatise on weights and measures by Paul of Aegina; Libri universales quatuor ("Four Books Unabridged," often known by its Greek name Tetrabiblos, Basel 1542), Latin translation. Only nine of the books of Aetius are extant in Greek, and Cornarius's translation is the sole source for the full sixteen. "De significationibus stellarum ex sermone III Tetrabibli Aetij Amideni caput CLXIV, interprete Cornario" ("Chapter 164, on Interpretational Techniques pertaining to Stars, from the Third Lecture of the Tetrabiblos of Aetius Amidenus as Translated by Cornarius," was reprinted in the Vranologion (Uranology, or "The Study of the Heavens") of Denis Pétau (Paris 1630). See also The Gynaecology and Obstetrics of the VIth century A.D., translated from the 1542 Latin edition of Cornarius and annotated by James V. Ricci (Philadelphia 1950).
  - Aetii Medici Graeci Contractae ex Veteribus Medicinae Sermones XVI . Gryphius, Venetiis 1549 Digital edition by the University and State Library Düsseldorf
- Marcellus Empiricus. De medicamentis liber ("The Book on Drugs," Basel 1536), editio princeps of the Latin text. Cornarius worked from a manuscript written in the mid-9th century that was superior to the one used for the Teubner edition of 1889 but which was thought to have been lost; it was rediscovered in 1913 and used for the 1916 edition of Marcellus published in Teubner's Corpus Medicorum Latinorum series. Referred to as the Codex Parisinus, it contains Cornarius's corrections and marginal notes.

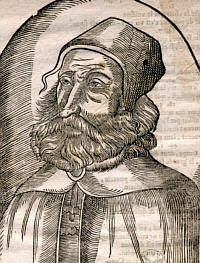
Galen

- Galen. De compositione pharmacorum localium … libri decem ("Ten Books on the Formulation of Site-specific Drugs," Basel 1537), Latin translation with commentary; Opera quae ad nos extant omnia … in latinam linguam conversa ("The Extant Works of Galen, Translated into the Latin Language," Basel 1549). Also of some interest are the marginalia that Cornarius wrote in his personal copy of Galen’s "De constitutione artis medicae" ("On the Foundations of Medical Practice"), the first widely available Greek text of the work, published at Aldine Press in 1525. The notes of Cornarius were published "not entirely accurately" by G. Gruner, Coniecturae et emendationes Galenicae (Jena 1789); the book itself is held by the library of the University of Jena.
- Geoponica, a Byzantine agricultural treatise, with Greek text edited by Andrés Laguna, usually catalogued as Constantini Caesaris [Cassii Dionysii Uticensis] selectarum praeceptionum de agricultura libri uiginti ("Twenty Books Selected from the 'Principles of Agriculture' of Constantinus Caesar," Basel or Venice 1538), the first complete translation into Latin of a compilation made by an anonymous author for Constantine VII Porphyrogenitus but sometimes identified with the work on agriculture by Cassius Dionysius of Utica. The preface of Cornarius is reprinted in the edition of J.N. Niclas, Geoponicorum siue de re rustica libri XX (Leipzig 1781), vol. 1, p. LXXVI ff.
- Artemidorus. Oneirokritika ("Dream Analysis"), published as De somniorum interpretatione, Libri quinque ("Five Books on the Interpretation of Dreams," 1539), Latin translation.
- Basil. Omnia D. Basilii Magni archiepiscopi Caesareae Cappadociae, quae extant, Opera ("Complete Extant Works of D. Basilius the Great, Archbishop of Caesara, Cappadocia," Basel 1540), Latin translation. ΑΠΑΝΤΑ ΤΟΥ ΘΕΙΟΥ ΚΑΙ ΜΕΓΑΛΟΥ ΚΑΛΟΥΜΕΝΟΥ ΒΑΣΙΛΕΙΟΥ / Divi Basilii Magni Opera Graeca quae ad nos extant omnia ("The Complete Works of the Divine Basil the Great That Survive to Our Day, in Greek," Basel 1551), Greek edition.
- Epiphanius of Salamis. D. Epiphanii Epistola sive liber Ancoratus appellatus, docens de vera fide Christiana ("The Letter of Decimus Epiphanius, also called the Book of the Anchor, teaching the true Christian faith"), with the Anacephaleosis, sive summa totius operis Panarij appellati, & contra octoaginta haereses conscripti ("the Anacephaleosis, or Summation, of the whole work called the Panarium, written to refute 80 heresies"), Libellus de mensuris ac ponderibus, & de asterisco ac obelo, deque notis ac characteribus in divinae scripturae interpretibus, per Origenem usurpatis ("a shorter book on measures and weights, and on the asterisk and obelus, and on notations and characters in translations of Holy Scripture, as put into use by Origen," Basel 1543), all in their first Latin translation. The work is usually referred to in English as the Panarion. Cornarius's edition is also catalogued as Contra octoaginta haereses opus, Panarium, sive Arcula, aut Capsula Medica appellatum, continens libros tres ("A Work Refuting 80 Heresies, Called the Bread-Basket, or the Storage-Box, or the Medical Bag, Containing Three Books").

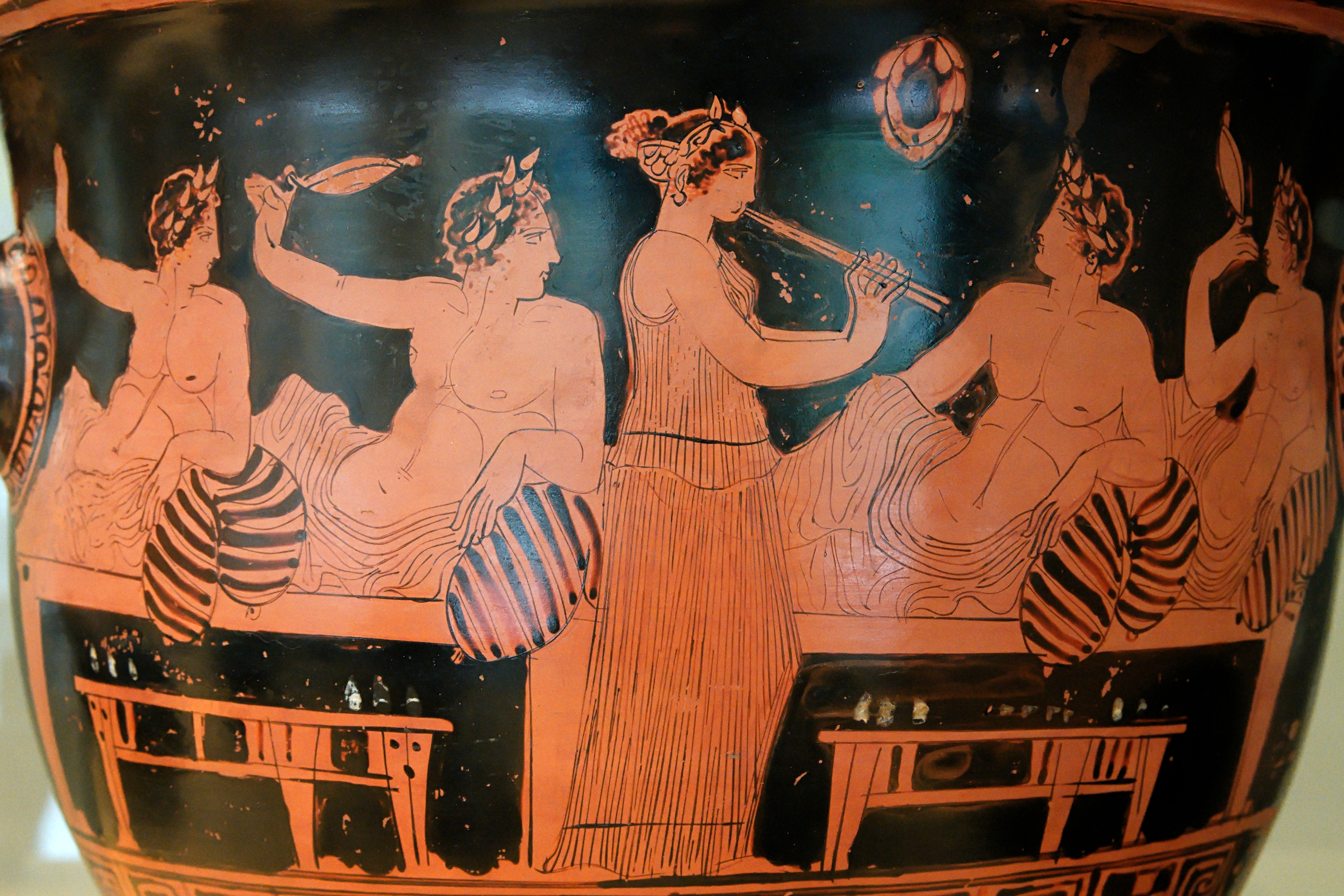
Convivial Greeks

- John Chrysostom. De episcopalis ac sacerdotalis muneris praestantia, Ioannis Chrysostomi, Episcopi Constantinopolitani cum Basilio Magno dissertatio ("A distinguished discourse on the service of bishops and priests by John Chrysostom, Bishop of Constantinople with Basil the Great," Basel 1544), Latin translation.
- Adamantius. Sophistae Physiognomicon, id est De Naturae Indicijs cognoscendis Libri duo ("Sophistic Physiognomy; that is, Two Books on Recognizing the Evidence of Nature," Basel 1544), Latin translation, with a work by Cornarius on alimentation in which he argues against the view of Plutarch.
- De rectis medicinae studiis amplectendis ("Understanding Correct Methods of Medicine," Basel 1545), a collection of his lectures for medical students in the "propaedeutic" genre.
- De conviviis veterum Graecorum, et hoc tempore Germanorum ritibus, moribus ac sermonibus; … Platonis et Xenophontis symposium (Basel 1548), introductory treatise on ancient and modern banquets ("On the Banquets of the Ancient Greeks, and the Conventions, Customs, and Conversation of the Germans of Our Own Day"), followed by Latin translations of the Symposium of Plato and the Symposium of Xenophon; notable as a rare example of a 16th-century account of contemporary dining behavior.
- De peste libri duo ("Two books on plague," 1551); despite making a case for disease as divine punishment, Cornarius mostly concerns himself with how the plague was spread by corrupted air and by contact with plague-infected bodies.
- Paul of Aegina. Totius rei medicae libri VII ("Seven Comprehensive Books on the Subject of Medicine," Basel 1556), Latin translation.
- Plato. Opera omnia ("Complete Works," Basel 1561), also catalogued as Platonis Atheniensis, philosophi summi ac penitus divini opera (in latinam vertit Cornario) ("The Works of Plato the Athenian, Greatest and Deeply Inspired Philosopher, Translated into Latin by Cornarius"), published posthumously.

== Selected bibliography ==
- Allen, P.S. Opus Epistolarum Des. Erasmi Roterodami. Oxford: Clarendon Press, 1934. Letter by Erasmus (in Latin) to Cornarius, vol. 8 (1529–1530), pp. 250–251, with commentary in English.
- Bietenholz, Peter G., and Thomas B. Deutscher. Contemporaries of Erasmus: A Biographical Register of the Renaissance and Reformation. University of Toronto Press, 2003. Entry on Cornarius, vol. 1, pp. 339–340.
- Hieronymus, Frank. "Griechischer Geist aus Basler Pressen." Search (Wortsuche) Cornarius for links to discussion (in German) of individual works published at Basel, with sample pages of the books in digital facsimile (retrieved July 6, 2008).
- Kusukawa, Sachiko. "Leonhart Fuchs on the Importance of Pictures." Journal of the History of Ideas 58 (1997) 403–427. On the intellectual debate between Fuchs and Cornarius, pp. 423–426.
- Summa Gallicana. "Cornarius Janus — Haynpol Johann." Discussion in Italian, with the Latin text of Melchior Adam’s Vita (retrieved June 21, 2008).
