= St. Michael's Church, Grodków =

Coordinates: 50.4152°N 17.2257°E

St. Michael's Church
- Kościół św. Michała Archanioła w Grodkowie
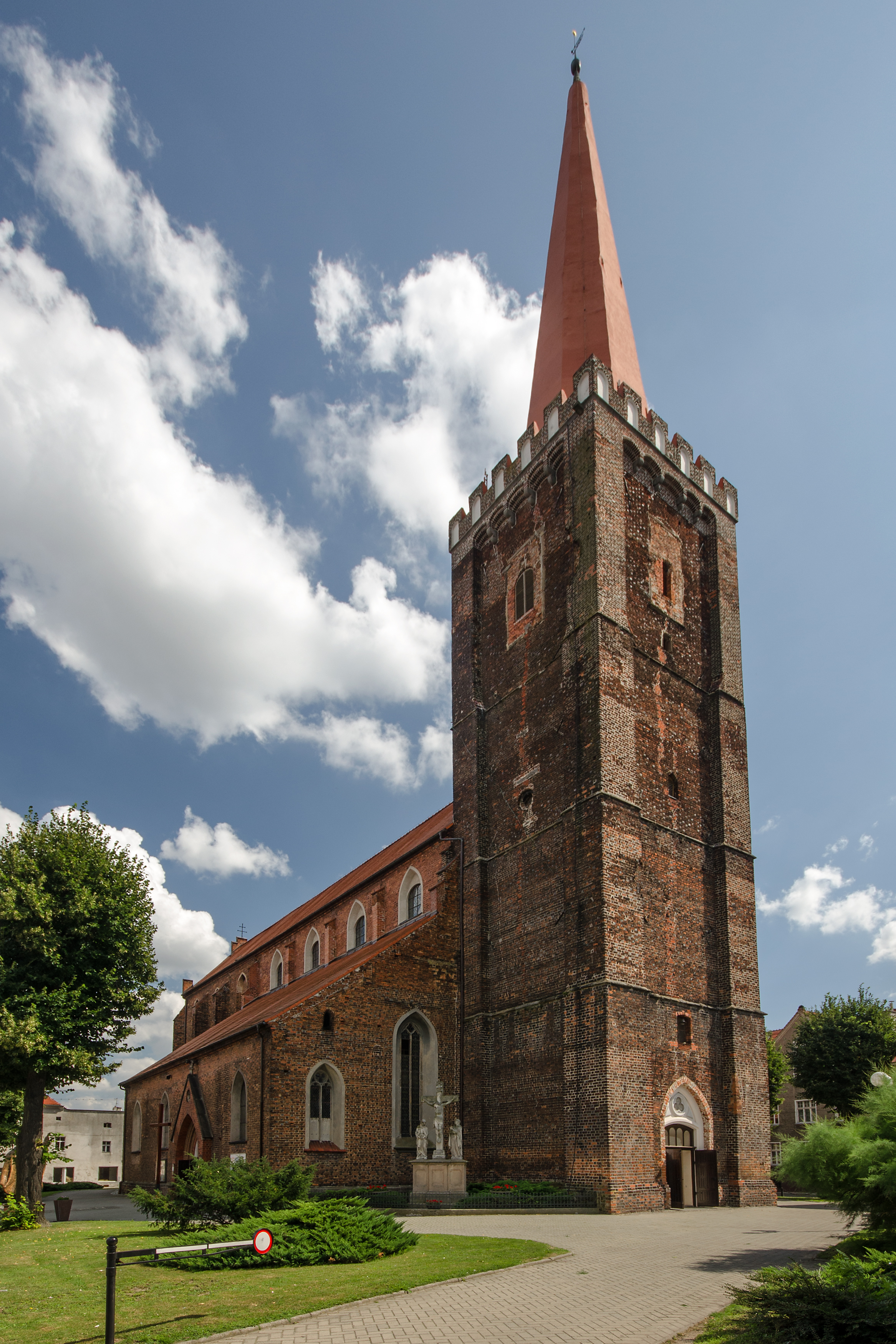
- St. Michael's Church
- St. Michael's Church
- Location: Grodków
- Country: Poland
- Denomination: Roman Catholic
- Website: Official Website

History
- Founder: Bishop of Wrocław Preczlaw of Pogarell

Architecture
- Style: Gothic
- Completed: 1282

Specifications
- Materials: Brick

Administration
- Diocese: Roman Catholic Diocese of Opole
- Parish: Parafia św. Michała Archanioła w Grodkowie

St. Michael's Church in Grodków, Poland, is a Gothic parish church built in the thirteenth century. The church belongs to the Roman Catholic Diocese of Opole.

The church was built in the Early-Gothic architectural style, first mentioned in 1282, in 1449 burned down by a fire and subsequently rebuilt. The expansion work on the church in the fifteenth and sixteenth-century was blighted by the Thirty Years' War and as such was burned down again. Prior to 1671, the church was renovated by Bishop of Wrocław, Sebastian von Rostock.

The church began to be Re-Gothicised in 1893.
