= Grodków =

Town in Opole Voivodeship, Poland

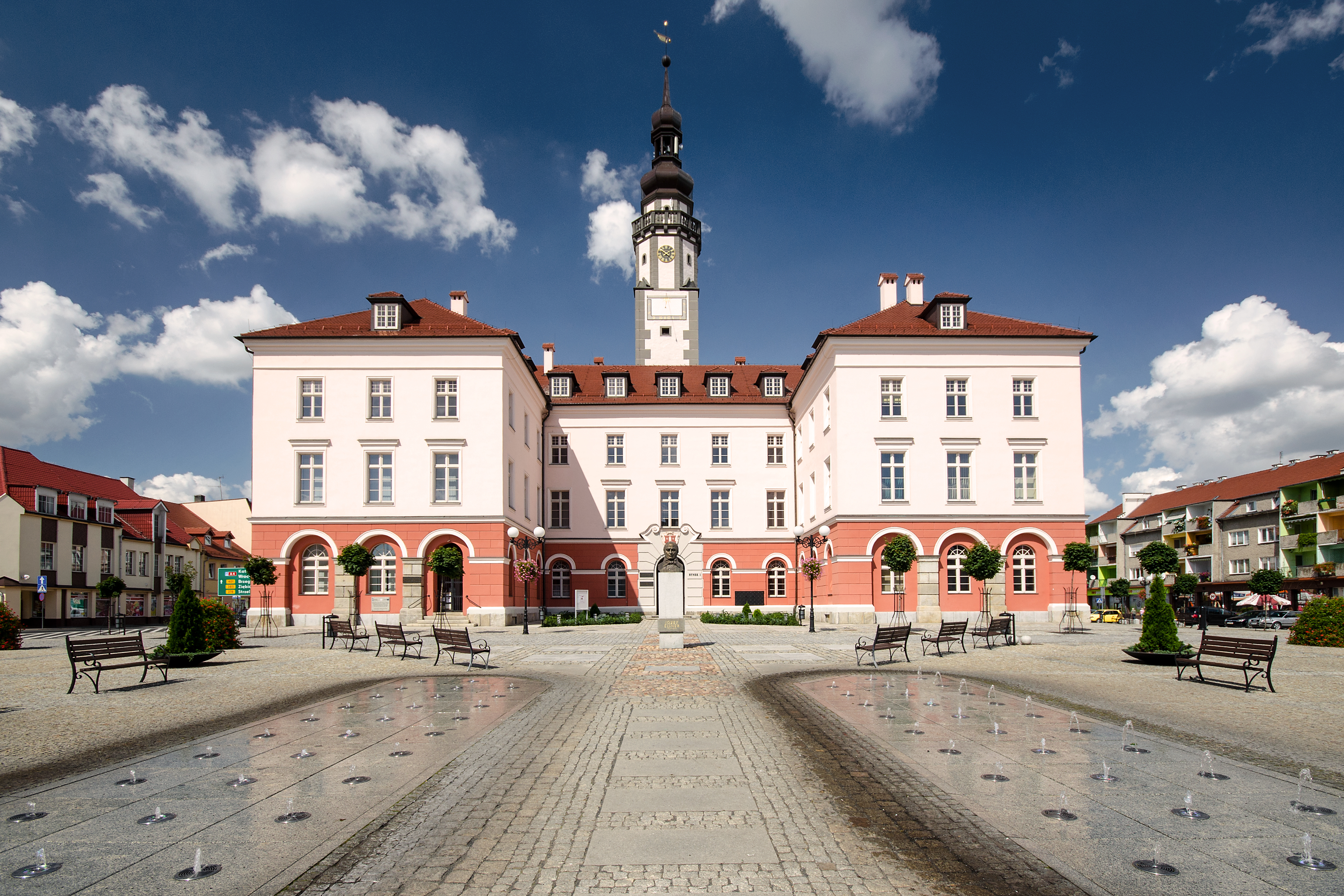
- Town Hall in Grodków

- Flag Coat of arms

- Location within Poland
- Coordinates: 50°41′53″N 17°23′04″E
- Country: Poland
- Voivodeship: Opole
- County: Brzeg
- Gmina: Grodków
- First mentioned: 1210
- Town rights: 1268

Government
  - Mayor: Miłosz Stanisław Krok

Area
  - Total: 9.88 km^{2} (3.81 sq mi)
- Elevation: 172 m (564 ft)

Population (2019-06-30)
  - Total: 8,595
  - Density: 870/km^{2} (2,250/sq mi)
- Time zone: UTC+1 (CET)
  - Summer (DST): UTC+2 (CEST)
- Postal code: 49-200
- Car plates: OB
- Website: http://www.grodkow.pl

Grodków ([ˈɡrɔtkuf]; German: Grottkau; Silesian: Grodkōw) is a town in Brzeg County, Opole Voivodeship in Poland, the administrative seat of Gmina Grodków. It is located in the Silesian Lowlands of the Oder basin, in the historic Upper Silesia region, about 20 km (12 mi) south of Brzeg. In the north, it has access to the A4 autostrada. The town has 8,595 inhabitants (2019).

== History ==
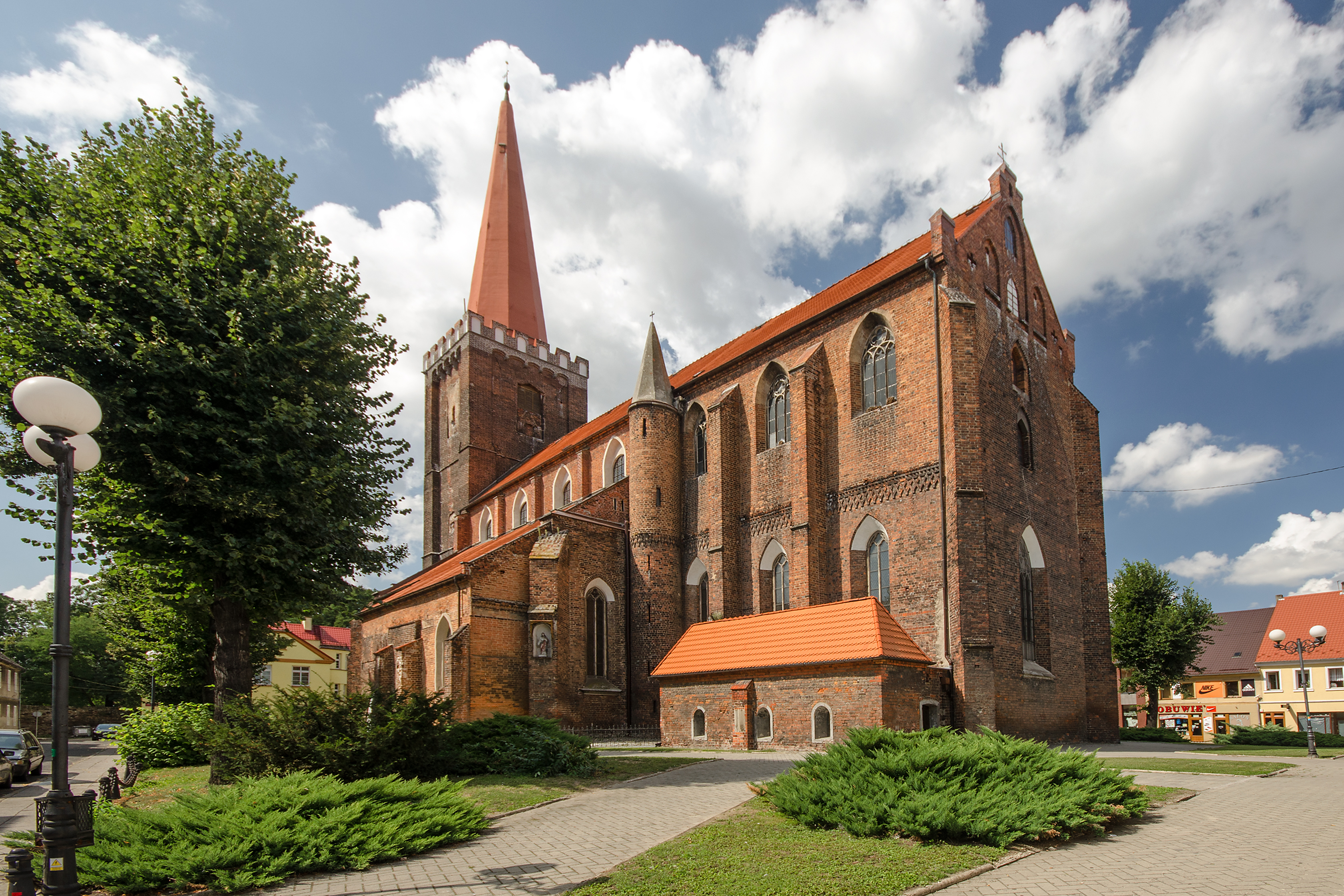
Gothic St. Michael's Church

The area was included in the emerging Polish state around 990 by its first historic ruler Mieszko I of the Piast dynasty and after the 12th-century fragmentation of the realm it was part of the Polish duchies of Silesia and Brzeg. The settlement of villa Grodcobichi in the Duchy of Silesia was first mentioned in a 1210 deed. Its name is of Polish origin and comes from the word gród, which means "stronghold" in Polish. The neighbouring settlement of Nowy Grodków (Neu Grottkau) was laid out by German settlers in the course of the Ostsiedlung, it was granted town rights modeled on Środa Śląska in 1268 by the Silesian duke Henryk IV Probus. Defensive walls were built in 1296. Also in the 13th century the Gothic St. Michael's Church, one of the most distinctive and valuable historic landmarks of Grodków, was built. The medieval city plan was characterized by a rectangular marketplace and four streets leading to the towers of the city gates and the nearby towns of Nysa, Ziębice, Wrocław and Lewin. In 1308 it was granted staple right. Upon the 1311 partition of the Silesian duchy, Grodków fell to the Duchy of Brzeg ruled by Duke Bolesław III the Generous, who became a Bohemian vassal in 1327. In 1344 he sold the town to Bishop Przecław of Wrocław, who attached it to his Silesian Duchy of Nysa. Later their suzerain, the Bohemian king Wenceslaus, granted the Wrocław bishops the title of a "Duke of Grodków", which they retained until the secularisation of the bishopric in 1810.

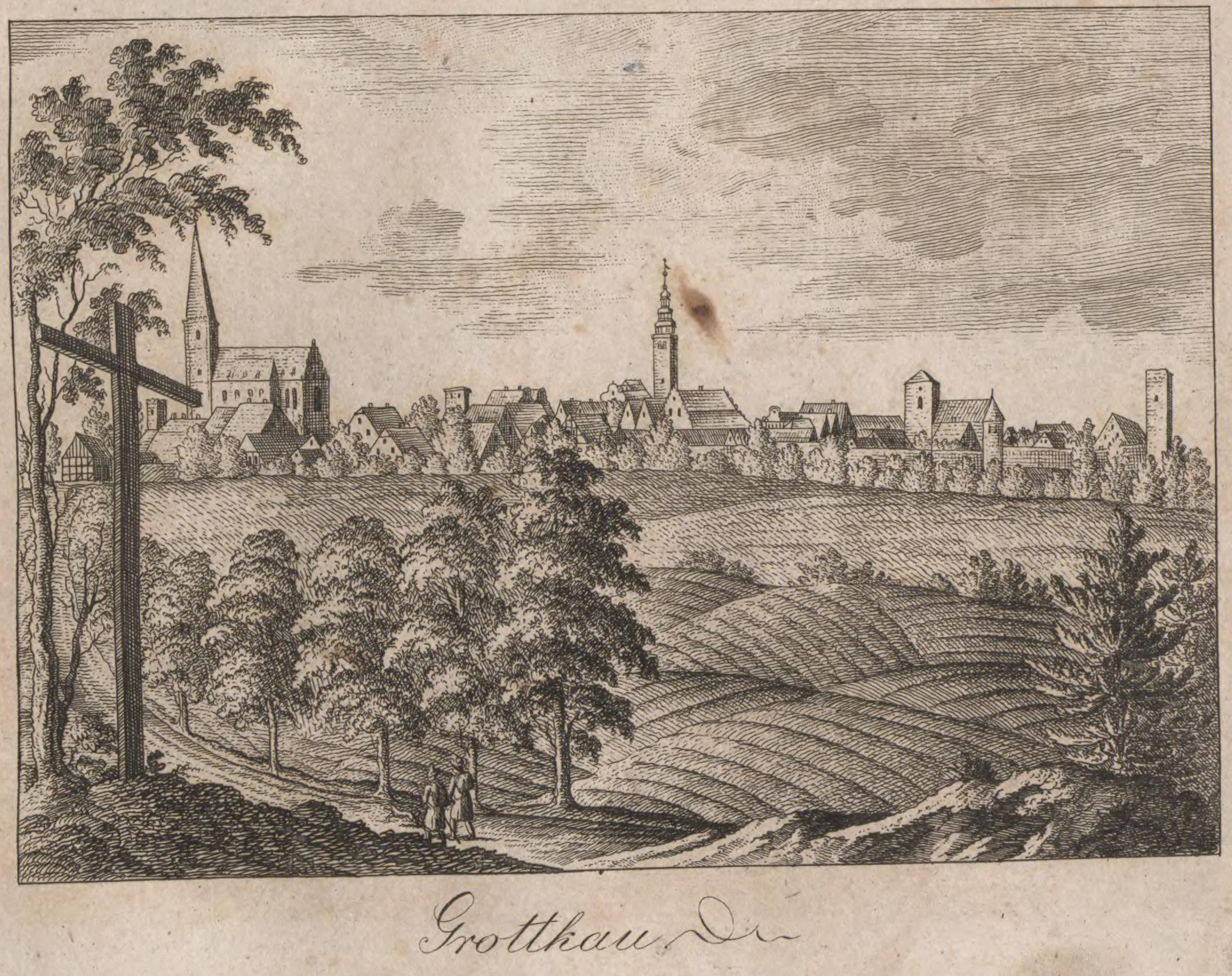
View of Grottkau, 1819

Grodków was devastated during the Hussite Wars and again in the Thirty Years' War, after which it was rebuilt under the rule of its native son Bishop Sebastian von Rostock. With the Bohemian kingdom, the town was incorporated into the Habsburg monarchy in 1526. After the First Silesian War of 1740–42, it was annexed by King Frederick the Great of Prussia, the Prussian garrison established after the Seven Years' War in 1763 was not disbanded until 1920. From 1815 onwards, under the Germanized name Grottkau, it was part of the Silesia Province. Its population was predominantly Catholic.

The town had 4,867 inhabitants in 1939 and was a district seat (Landkreis Grottkau) until 1945. During World War II the Germans established a forced labour camp and two prisoner-of-war labour camps in the town. The town was heavily damaged during the Vistula–Oder Offensive of the Red Army and after the war it became part of Poland.

Polish rule was established, unbeknownst to the local German populace. At first, Polish troops came for plundering. Then, in the surroundings, village by village was surrounded by Polish militia and people were evicted. The former provincial education institute was made an internment camp, many died under bad conditions.

== Economy ==
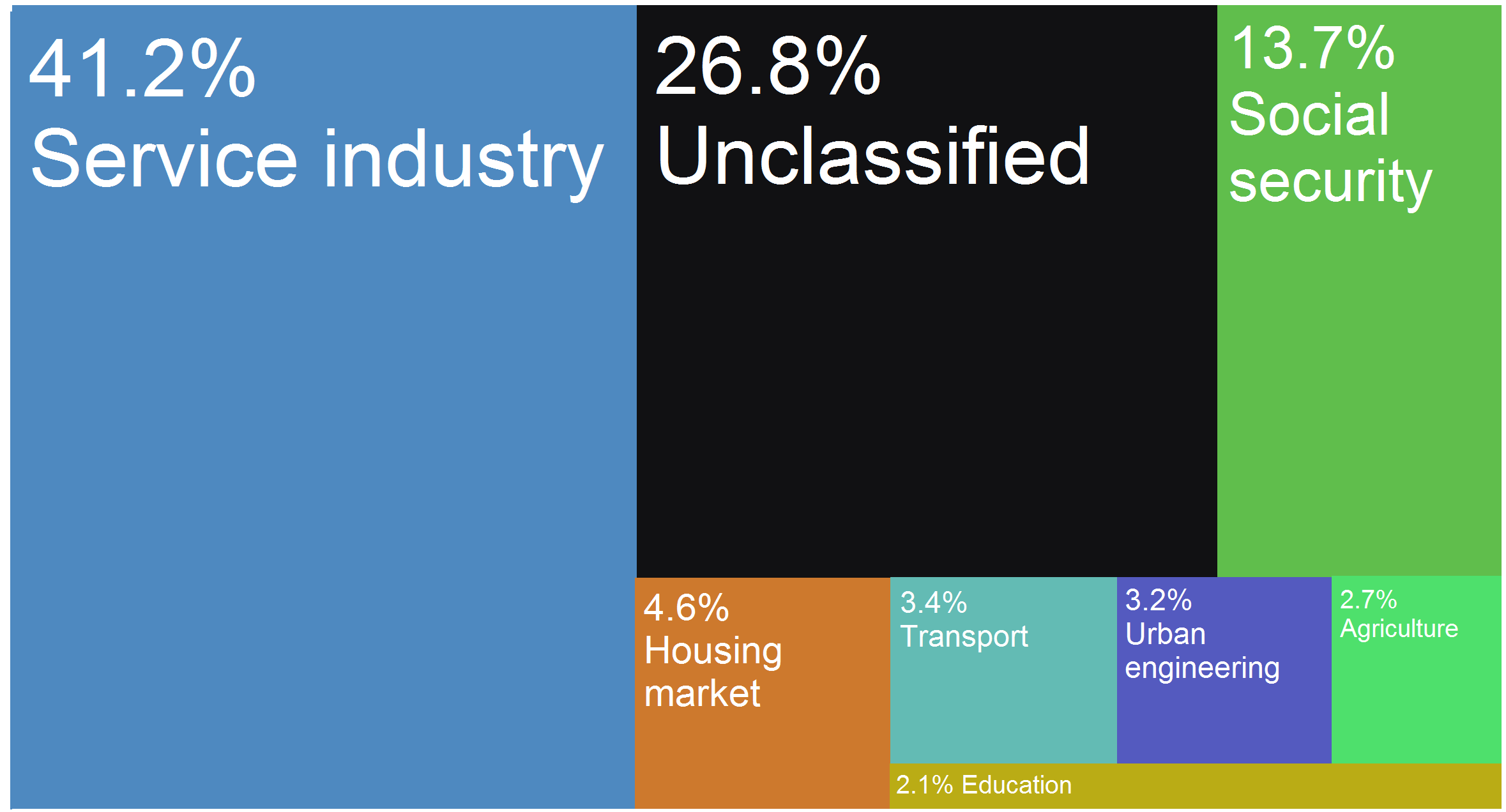
Grodków city budget income sources as of 2015.

Grodków is the centre for commerce, business and industry in the regional locality of Gmina Grodków. The town's gmina is largely dependent on the agricultural sector, due to the Opole Voivodeship's fertile soil, being a major factor in the town's economy alike. The town has a department for the local shopping chain "Wimar Bort", located by Henryk Sienkiewicz Street (ul. Henryka Sienkiewicza). The settlement has a major industrial complex located to its north, including: "Grodkono" waffles food production; "Nalewki Kresowe" producing the Polish alcoholic beverage nalewka, as well as a vulcanisation plant, all located by Lipowa Street (ul. Lipowa).

== Transport ==
Grodków is located south of the Przylesie interchange (Węzeł Przylesie), connecting the Voivodeship Road 401 to the A4 motorway. The town has a railway station, with the Nysa–Grodków–Brzeg line crossing through the city.

== Climate ==
Climate data for Grodków (1985–2015)
Month	Jan	Feb	Mar	Apr	May	Jun	Jul	Aug	Sep	Oct	Nov	Dec	Year
Mean daily maximum °C (°F)	2.0 (35.6)	3.0 (37.4)	8.0 (46.4)	14.0 (57.2)	19.0 (66.2)	22.0 (71.6)	24.0 (75.2)	25.0 (77.0)	20.0 (68.0)	15.0 (59.0)	8.0 (46.4)	3.0 (37.4)	13.6 (56.5)
Daily mean °C (°F)	−1.0 (30.2)	0.0 (32.0)	8.0 (46.4)	11.0 (51.8)	11.0 (51.8)	16.5 (61.7)	19.0 (66.2)	19.5 (67.1)	15.0 (59.0)	10.0 (50.0)	4.5 (40.1)	0.5 (32.9)	9.5 (49.1)
Mean daily minimum °C (°F)	−3.0 (26.6)	−3.0 (26.6)	0.0 (32.0)	3.0 (37.4)	8.0 (46.4)	11.0 (51.8)	14.0 (57.2)	14.0 (57.2)	10.0 (50.0)	5.0 (41.0)	1.0 (33.8)	−2.0 (28.4)	4.8 (40.6)
Average precipitation mm (inches)	37 (1.5)	32 (1.3)	40 (1.6)	36 (1.4)	64 (2.5)	59 (2.3)	70 (2.8)	57 (2.2)	44 (1.7)	28 (1.1)	38 (1.5)	37 (1.5)	542 (21.3)
Average precipitation days	13.5	12.7	13.8	11.3	14.1	14.8	14.7	11.9	10.5	8.9	11.6	13.6	151.4
Source: meteoblue.com

== Sports ==
Handball club Olimp Grodków is based in the town.

== Notable people ==
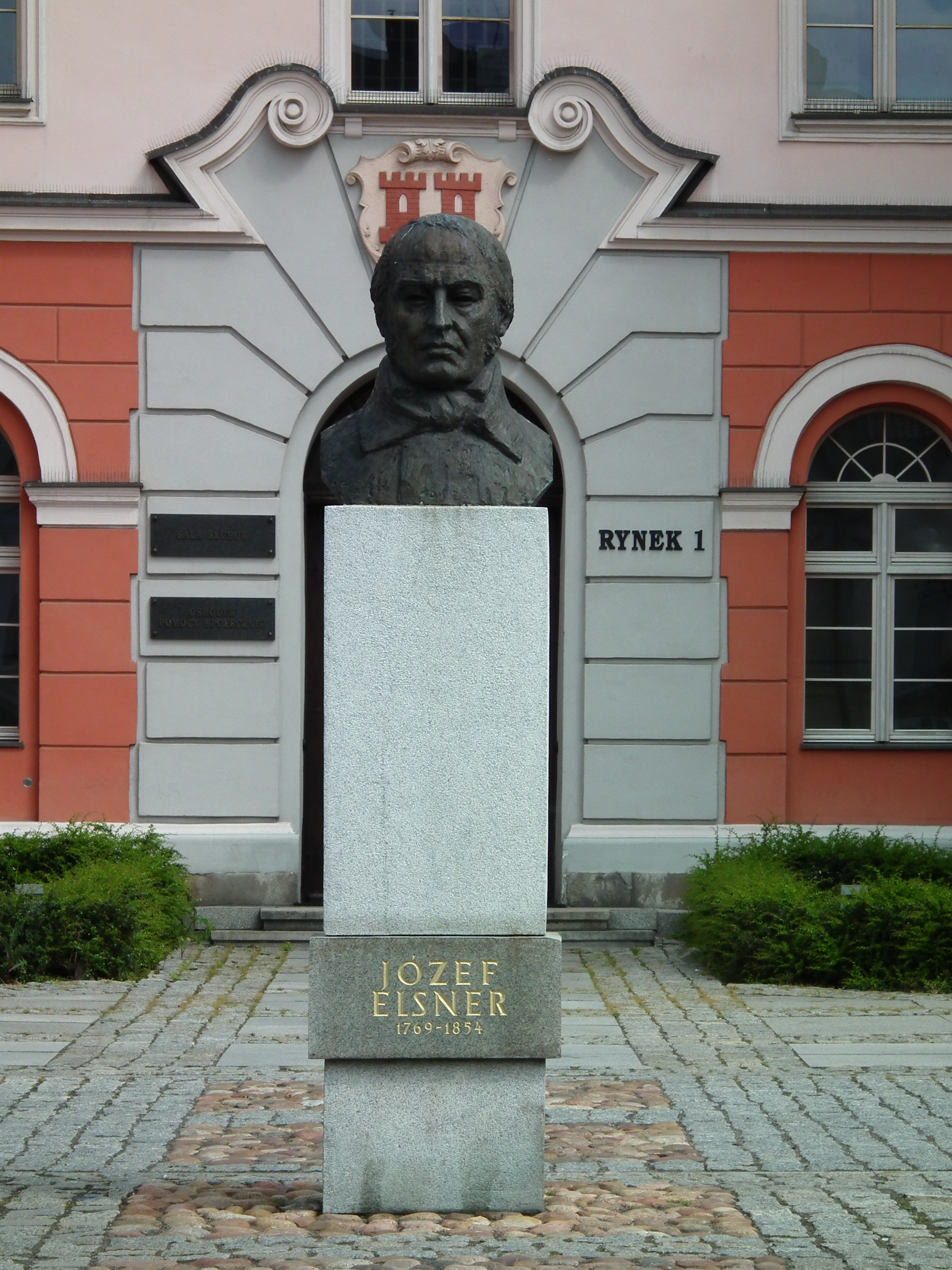
Monument of Józef Elsner in front of the town hall

- Melchior Adam (1575–1622), literature historian
- Sebastian von Rostock (1607–1671), Bishop of Wrocław
- Sylvius Leopold Weiss (1687–1750), composer
- Józef Elsner (1769–1854), composer, teacher of Fryderyk Chopin
- Julius von Roeder (1806–1889), Prussian General
- Johannes Ronge (1813–1887), founder of the German Catholics, worked as a chaplain at the Grottkau parish church from 1840 to 1843.
- Bruno von Kern (1860–1932), Prussian General
- Hans-Georg Herzog (1912–1959), Wehrmacht officer
- Helmut Scholz (1920–1997), German officer
- Adam Gardzina (born 1952), former Polish basketball player and member of Poland men's national basketball team
- Henryk Mrowiec (born 1960), former Polish handball player and member of Poland men's national handball team
- Marek Pazdur (born 1960), former Polish handball player and member of Poland men's national handball team
- Piotr Gacek (born 1978), former Polish volleyball player and member of Poland men's national volleyball team
- Marek Gancarczyk (born 1983), Polish footballer
- Jan Klimków (born 1998), Polish handball player and member of Poland men's national handball team

== Twin towns – sister cities ==
See twin towns of Gmina Grodków.

== See also ==
- St. Michael's Church, Grodków
