= Maria Leopoldine of Austria =

Holy Roman Empress from 1648 to 1649

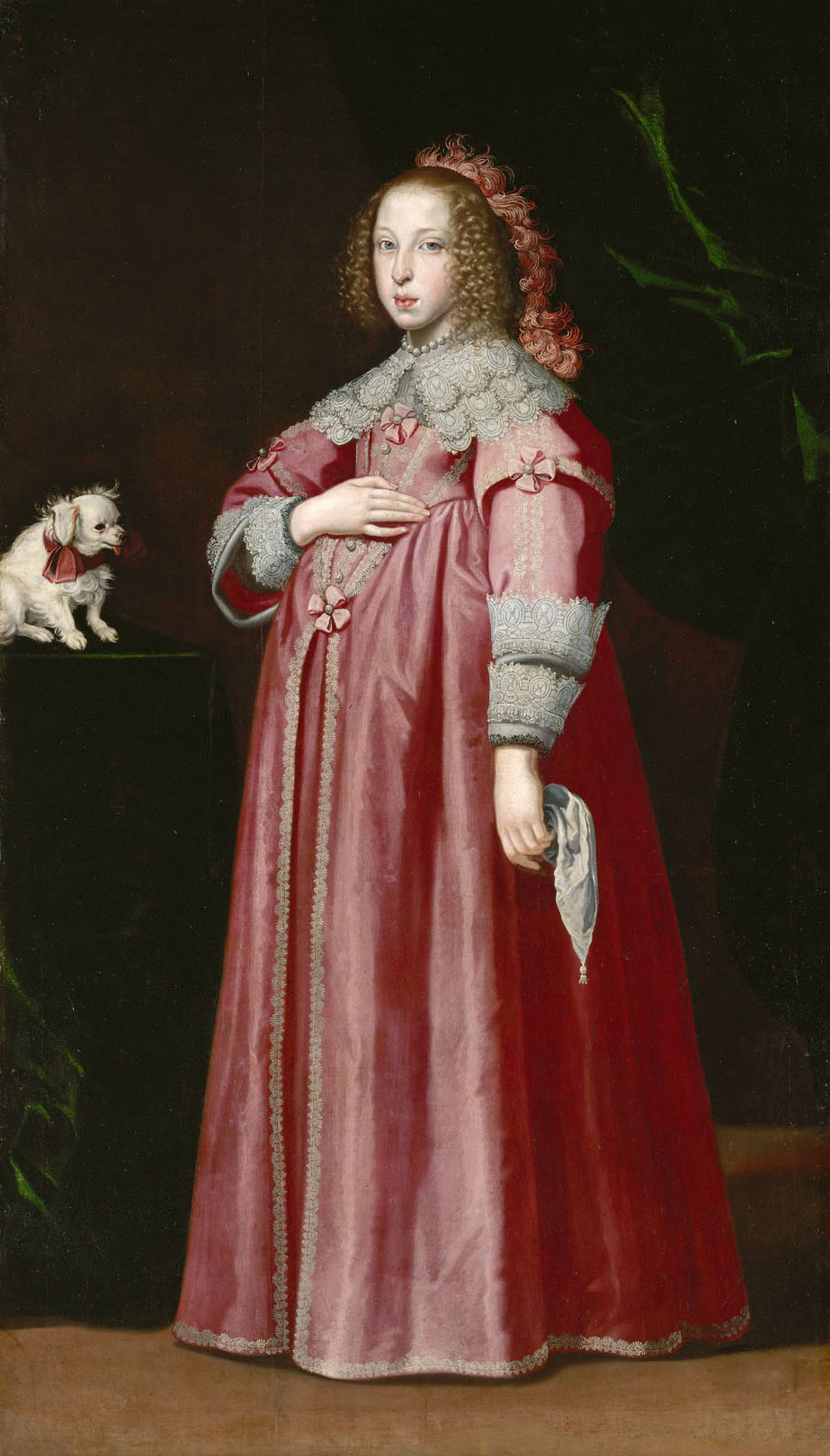
- Portrait by Lorenzo Lippi, 1649

Holy Roman Empress
- Tenure: 2 July 1648 – 7 August 1649
- Born: 6 April 1632; Innsbruck, County of Tyrol, Holy Roman Empire
- Died: 7 August 1649 (aged 17); Vienna, Archduchy of Austria, Holy Roman Empire
- Burial: Imperial Crypt, Vienna, Austria
- Spouse: Ferdinand III, Holy Roman Emperor (m. 1648)
- Issue: Archduke Charles Joseph of Austria
- House: Habsburg
- Father: Leopold V, Archduke of Further Austria
- Mother: Claudia de' Medici

Maria Leopoldine of Austria-Tyrol (6 April 1632 – 7 August 1649) was by birth Archduchess of Austria and member of the Tyrolese branch of the House of Habsburg and by marriage the second spouse of her first cousin, Ferdinand III, Holy Roman Emperor. As such, she was Empress of the Holy Roman Empire, German queen and queen consort of Hungary and Bohemia. She died in childbirth, aged 17.

== Life ==
=== Early years ===
Maria Leopoldine was born in Innsbruck on 6 April 1632 as the third (but second surviving) daughter and the fifth and youngest child of Leopold V, Archduke of Further Austria, and Claudia de' Medici. Her father died on 13 September 1632, when she was five months old. On her father's side, her grandparents were Charles II, Archduke of Inner Austria and his wife and niece Princess Maria Anna of Bavaria; on her mother's side, her grandparents were Ferdinando I de' Medici, Grand Duke of Tuscany and his wife Princess Christina of Lorraine. In addition to her full siblings, she had an older half-sister, Vittoria della Rovere, born from her mother's first marriage to Federico Ubaldo della Rovere, Duke of Urbino.

Maria Leopoldine's oldest brother, Ferdinand Charles, inherited Further Austria, but Dowager Archduchess Claudia assumed regency because of her son's minority. In a letter written to his mother, Elizabeth of England, on 8 September 1641, Charles Louis of the Palatinate (later Elector Palatine) mentioned the possibility of a marriage between the 9-year-old archduchess and himself; the marriage between them would be to end "all grudges betweene our families". However, the union never took place because he was a Protestant, and the staunchly Catholic Habsburgs never allowed any marriages between their members and Protestants.

=== Empress and Queen ===
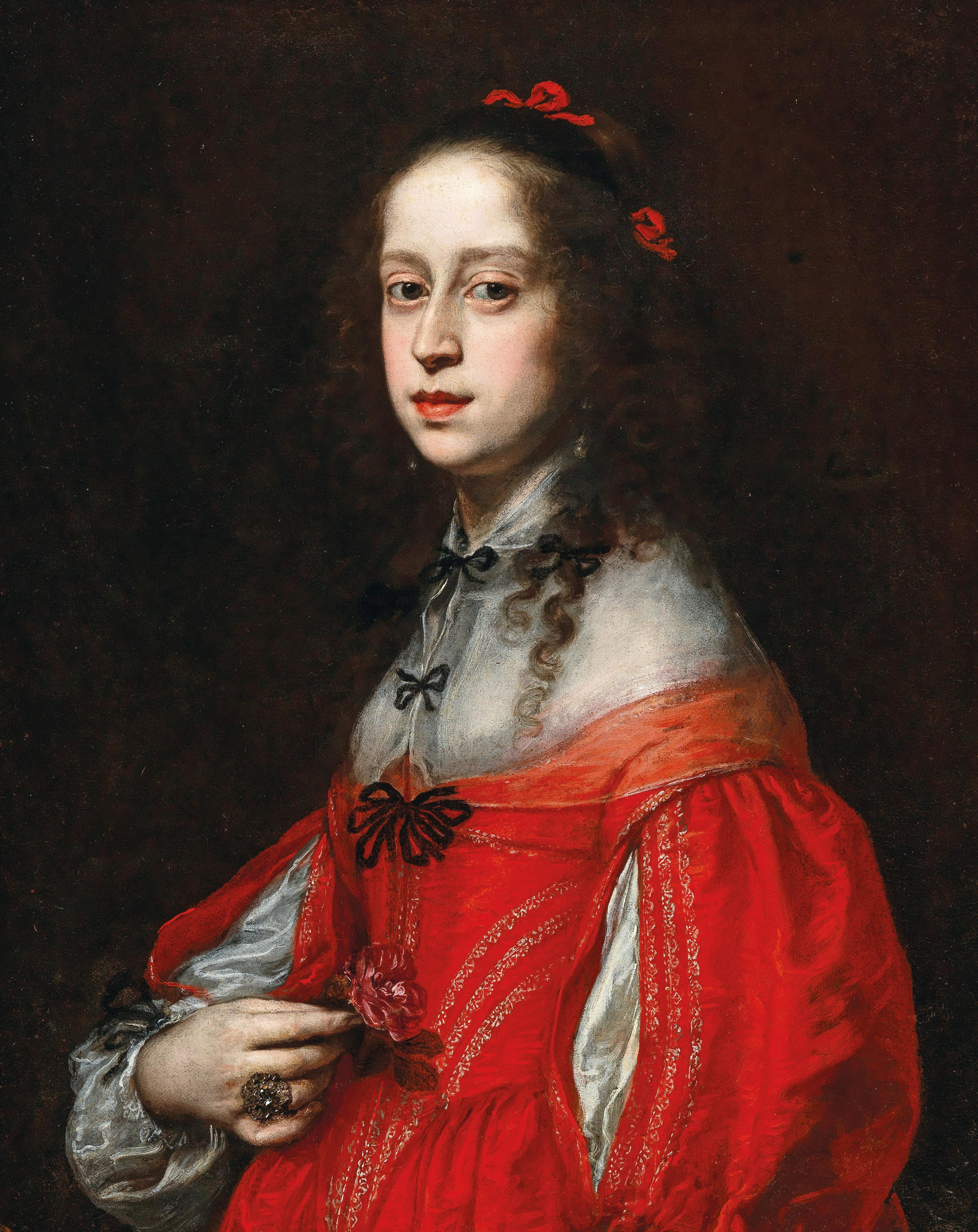
Portrait by Justus Sustermans, 1647

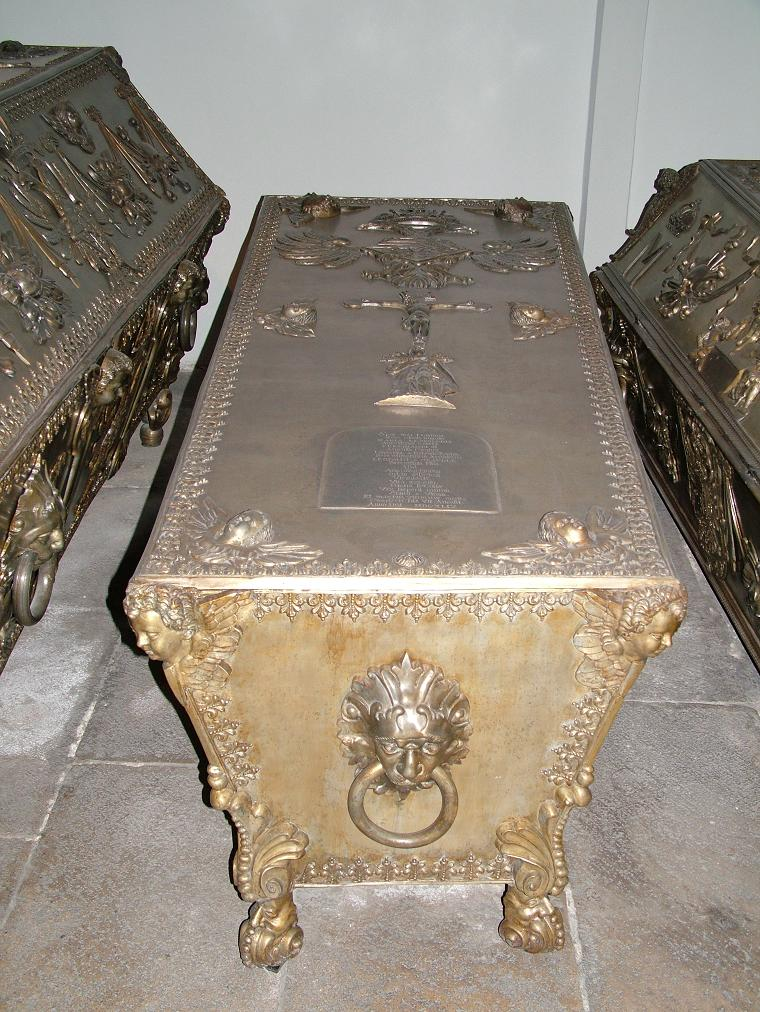
Sarcophagus of Maria Leopoldine in the Imperial Crypt, Vienna

In Linz on 2 July 1648 Maria Leopoldine married the widowed Holy Roman Emperor Ferdinand III, thereby becoming Empress of the Holy Roman Empire, Queen of the Germans, Queen of Hungary and Queen of Bohemia. The wedding ceremony was splendid. The composer Andreas Rauch celebrated the marriage as "anticipating (with the help of Divine Providence) the most beautiful end of the Thirty Years' War" and an opera titled I Trionfi d'Amore, produced by Giovanni Felice Sances, was meant to commemorate the event, but the Prague premiere was canceled at the last moment when King Władysław IV Vasa (Ferdinand III's brother-in-law) died within two months of the wedding; the planned Pressburg performance apparently never took place. The new empress was as closely related to her husband as her cousin and predecessor, Maria Anna of Spain; both marriages were means by which the House of Habsburg frequently reinforced itself, and ultimately succumbed to inbreeding.

Soon after her wedding, Maria Leopoldine became pregnant, and was depicted as such in the 1649 painting by the Italian painter and poet Lorenzo Lippi. The Imperial couple's only child, Archduke Charles Joseph of Austria, was born on 7 August 1649. The childbirth was extremely difficult, ending in the death of the 17-year-old empress. Her husband remarried within two years, while their son died childless aged 14. She is buried in tomb 21 in the Imperial Crypt in Vienna. The writer Wolf Helmhardt, Baron von Hohberg, then at the beginning of his career, sent to Emperor Ferdinand III a poem written in honour of the late Empress, called "Poem of tears" (de: Klag-Gedicht).

== Ancestry ==
Ancestors of Maria Leopoldine of Austria

8. Ferdinand I, Holy Roman Emperor
4. Charles II, Archduke of Austria
9. Anna of Bohemia and Hungary
2. Leopold V, Archduke of Austria
10. Albert V, Duke of Bavaria
5. Maria Anna of Bavaria
11. Anna of Austria
1. Maria Leopoldine of Austria
12. Cosimo I de' Medici, Grand Duke of Tuscany
6. Ferdinando I de' Medici, Grand Duke of Tuscany
13. Eleanor de Toledo
3. Claudia de' Medici
14. Charles III, Duke of Lorraine
7. Christina of Lorraine
15. Claude of Valois

Maria Leopoldine of Austria House of Habsburg Born: 6 April 1632 Died: 7 July 1649
Royal titles
Vacant Title last held by Maria Anna of Spain	Holy Roman Empress; German queen; Queen consort of Hungary and Bohemia; Archduchess consort of Austria; 1648–1649	Vacant Title next held by Eleanor of Mantua
