= Flag of Grodków =

Grodków
- Flag of Grodków
- Proportion: 5:8
- Adopted: February 26, 2003
- Design: A tricolour white, yellow and red flag

The flag of Grodków is the town flag of the town of Grodków, Opole Voivodeship in Poland. The flag of Grodków has three colours: white, yellow and red, arranged in a tricolour of equally spaced sections; the top one being white; the middle being yellow; and the bottom line being red. When the flag of Grodków is arranged as a sideways banner, the white colour is positioned on the left. The flag was adopted on February 26, 2003.
