= Archduke Charles Joseph of Austria =

Charles Joseph of Austria
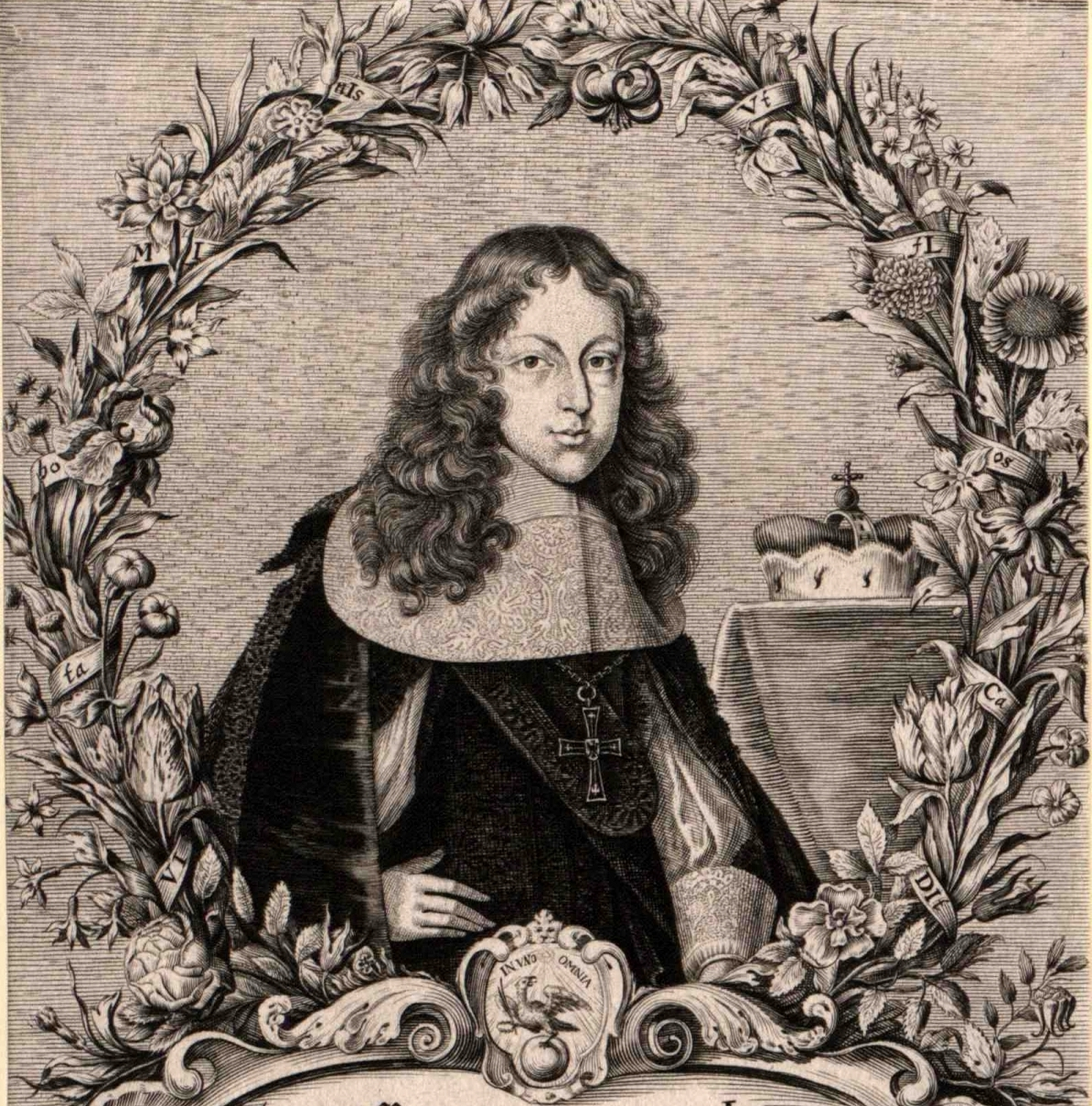

Prince-Bishop of Olomouc
- Reign: 1662 – 27 January 1664
- Born: Charles Joseph; 7 August 1649; Vienna, Archduchy of Austria, Holy Roman Empire
- Died: 27 January 1664 (aged 14); Linz, Archduchy of Austria, Holy Roman Empire
- House: Habsburg
- Father: Ferdinand III
- Mother: Maria Leopoldine of Austria
- Religion: Roman Catholicism

Charles Joseph (German: Karl Joseph) (7 August 1649 – 27 January 1664) was an Archduke of Austria and Grand Master of the Teutonic Knights (1662–1664). He was also the Bishop of Olmütz, and Breslau, Passau.

== Life ==
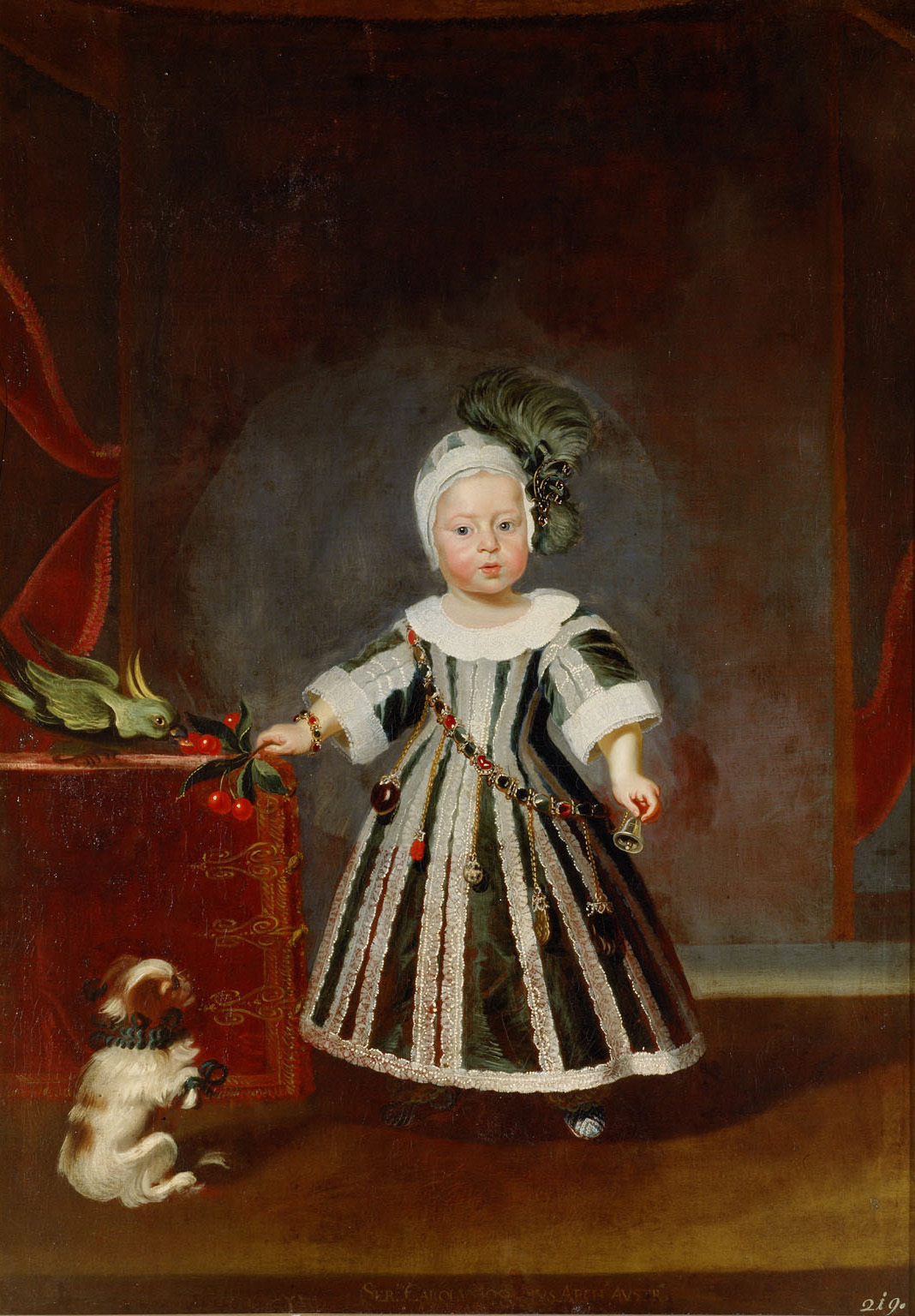
Portrait at the age of one, by Frans Luycx

Charles Joseph was born on 7 August 1649, in Vienna to parents Ferdinand III and Maria Leopoldine. Destined for a life in the clergy, he was appointed as the Bishop of Passau and Olmütz at the young age of 13, following in the footsteps of his uncle Archduke Leopold Wilhelm. He also became the Grand Master of the Teutonic Order.

In spite of this, there were still strong rumors that Charles Joseph could marry his niece Margaret Theresa of Spain, who was already betrothed to his brother Leopold, and in case the future King Charles II of Spain died, then Margaret and Charles Joseph would become the next Spanish monarchs. The fact that the young Archduke was Catholic and a Habsburg made him completely acceptable for the Spanish court, which would never accept a member of another dynasty and even less a Protestant as a marriage candidate for Margaret Theresa. In any case, the rumors about a marriage between the Spanish Infanta and the Archduke came to nothing and Margaret remained betrothed to Emperor Leopold.

Due to his youth, Charles Joseph was unable to attain higher orders as a bishop. He died at the age of 14 on 27 January 1664, in Linz, Austria, exhausted from battling an illness. His remains were transported by ship to Vienna, where he was laid to rest in the Imperial Crypt on 21 February 1664.

== Ancestry ==
Ancestors of Archduke Charles Joseph of Austria

8. Charles II, Archduke of Austria (= 12)
4. Ferdinand II, Holy Roman Emperor
9. Maria Anna of Bavaria (≠ 5)
2. Ferdinand III, Holy Roman Emperor
10. William V, Duke of Bavaria
5. Maria Anna of Bavaria (≠ 9)
11. Renata of Lorraine
1. Archduke Charles Joseph of Austria
12. Charles II, Archduke of Austria (= 8)
6. Leopold V, Archduke of Austria
13. Maria Anna of Bavaria (= 9)
3. Maria Leopoldine of Austria
14. Ferdinando I de' Medici, Grand Duke of Tuscany
7. Claudia de' Medici
15. Christina of Lorraine

== Male-line family tree ==
House of Habsburg

Original line
Albert; Count of Habsburg c. 1188–1239
Rudolf I of Germany c. 1218–1291
Albert I of Germany; 1255–1308	Hartmann; 1263–1281	Rudolf II; Duke of Austria; 1270–1290
Rudolf I of Bohemia; 1281–1307	Frederick the Fair c. 1289–1330	Leopold I Duke of Austria; 1290–1326	Albert II; Duke of Austria; 1298–1358	Henry the Friendly; 1299–1327	Otto; Duke of Austria; 1301–1339	John; Parricida c. 1290–1312/1313
Albertinian line	Leopoldian line
Rudolf IV; Duke of Austria; 1339–1365	Frederick III; 1347–1362	Albert III; Duke of Austria; 1349–1395	Leopold III; Duke of Austria; 1351–1386	Frederick II; Duke of Austria; 1327–1344	Leopold II; Duke of Austria; 1328–1344
Albert IV; Duke of Austria; 1377–1404	William; Duke of Austria c. 1370–1406	Leopold IV; Duke of Austria; 1371–1411	Ernest; Duke of Austria; 1377–1424	Frederick IV; Duke of Austria; 1382–1439
Albert II of Germany; 1397–1439	Frederick III; HRE; 1415–1493	Albert VI; Archduke of Austria; 1418–1463	Sigismund; Archduke of Austria; 1427–1496
Ladislaus the Posthumous; 1440–1457	Maximilian I HRE; 1459–1519
Philip I of Castile; 1478–1506
Spanish / Iberian line	Austrian / HRE line
Charles V HRE; 1500–1558	Ferdinand I HRE; 1503–1564
Philip II of Spain; 1527–1598	Maximilian II; HRE; 1527–1576	Ferdinand II; Archduke of Austria; 1529–1595	Charles II; Archduke of Austria; 1540–1590
Carlos; Prince of Asturias; 1545–1568	Philip III of Spain; 1578–1621	Rudolf II; HRE; 1552–1612	Ernest of Austria; 1553–1595	Matthias; HRE; 1557–1619	Maximilian III; Archduke of Austria; 1558–1618	Albert VII; Archduke of Austria; 1559–1621	Wenceslaus; Archduke of Austria; 1561–1578	Andrew; Margrave of Burgau; 1558–1600	Charles; Margrave of Burgau; 1560–1618	Ferdinand II; HRE; 1578–1637	Maximilian Ernest of Austria; 1583–1616	Leopold V Archduke of Austria; 1586–1632	Charles of Austria; 1590–1624
Philip IV of Spain; 1605–1665	Charles of Austria; 1607–1632	Ferdinand of Austria; 1609–1641	John-Charles of Austria; 1605–1619	Ferdinand III; HRE; 1608–1657	Leopold Wilhelm of Austria; 1614–1662	Ferdinand Charles; Archduke of Austria; 1628–1662	Sigismund Francis; Archduke of Austria; 1630–1665
Balthasar Charles; Prince of Asturias; 1629–1646	Charles II of Spain; 1661–1700	Ferdinand IV; King of the Romans; 1633–1654	Leopold I HRE; 1640–1705	Charles Joseph of Austria; 1649–1664
Joseph I HRE; 1678–1711	Charles VI; HRE; 1685–1740
Lorraine
Maria Theresa; HRE; 1740–1780	Francis I HRE; 1745–1765
Habsburg-Lorraine
Joseph II; HRE; 1765–1790	Leopold II; HRE; 1790–1792
Francis II; HRE; 1792–1806

Notes:

Archduke Charles Joseph of Austria House of Habsburg Born: 7 August 1649 in Vienna Died: 27 January 1664 in Linz
Regnal titles
Preceded by Archduke Leopold Wilhelm of Austria	Prince-Bishop of Passau; 1662–1664	Succeeded by Wenzeslaus von Thun
Preceded by Archduke Leopold Wilhelm of Austria	Prince-Bishop of Olomouc; 1662–1664	Succeeded by Karl II von Liechtenstein-Kastelkorn
Preceded by Archduke Leopold Wilhelm of Austria	Prince-Bishop of Breslau; 1662–1664	Succeeded by Sebastian von Rostock

Grand Master of the Teutonic Order
Preceded by Leopold Wilhelm	Hochmeister; 1662–1664	Succeeded by Johann Caspar von Ampringen
