= Grodków Town Hall =

Coordinates: 50.6983°N 17.3850°E

Ratusz w Grodkowie (Grodków Town Hall)
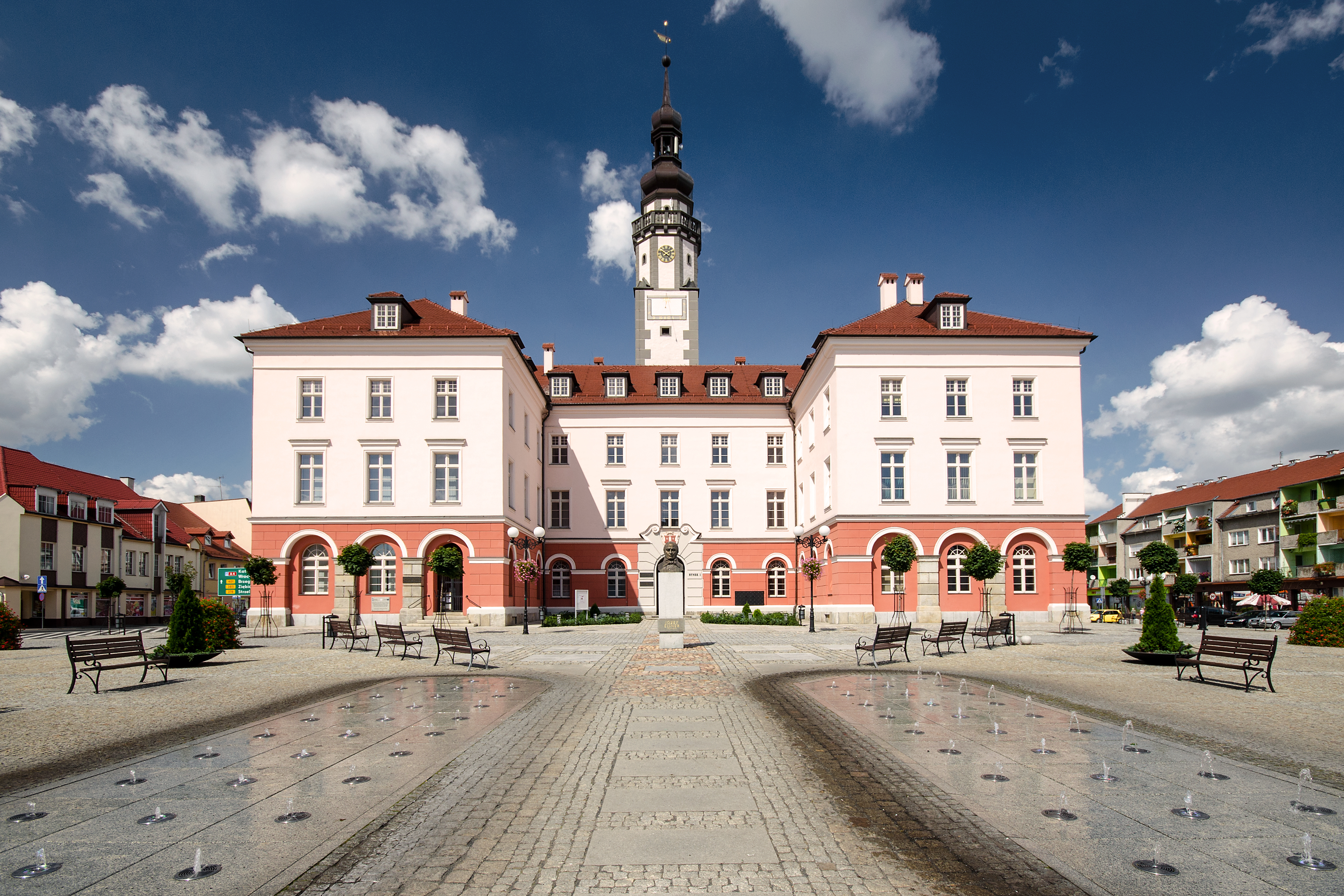
- Grodków Town Hall

General information
- Type: Town hall
- Architectural style: Classicism
- Location: Grodków, Poland
- Completed: 1840

Height
- Height: 36 m

Design and construction
- Architect: Philippi

Grodków Town Hall is a town hall built in the Classical architectural style in 1840, designed by architect Philippi, using the tower of the former town hall. Currently, the building is the seat of the Grodków City Council and other institutions.

== History ==
The first town hall in Grodków was raised at the turning point of the fourteenth and fifteenth centuries, after which the building was damaged by fires and rebuilt. In 1577 the existent tower was raised, which in 1668 was capped by a tented roof. In the years of 1833 and 1836, under the custody of master bricklayers J. Fleischer and F. Plander the tower was renovated. In 1833 the building burnt down in a large fire which engulfed the town. The current town hall was built in 1840, designed by architect Philippe from Opole, using the remaining tower. After 1945, the building was renovated numerous times.

== Gallery ==
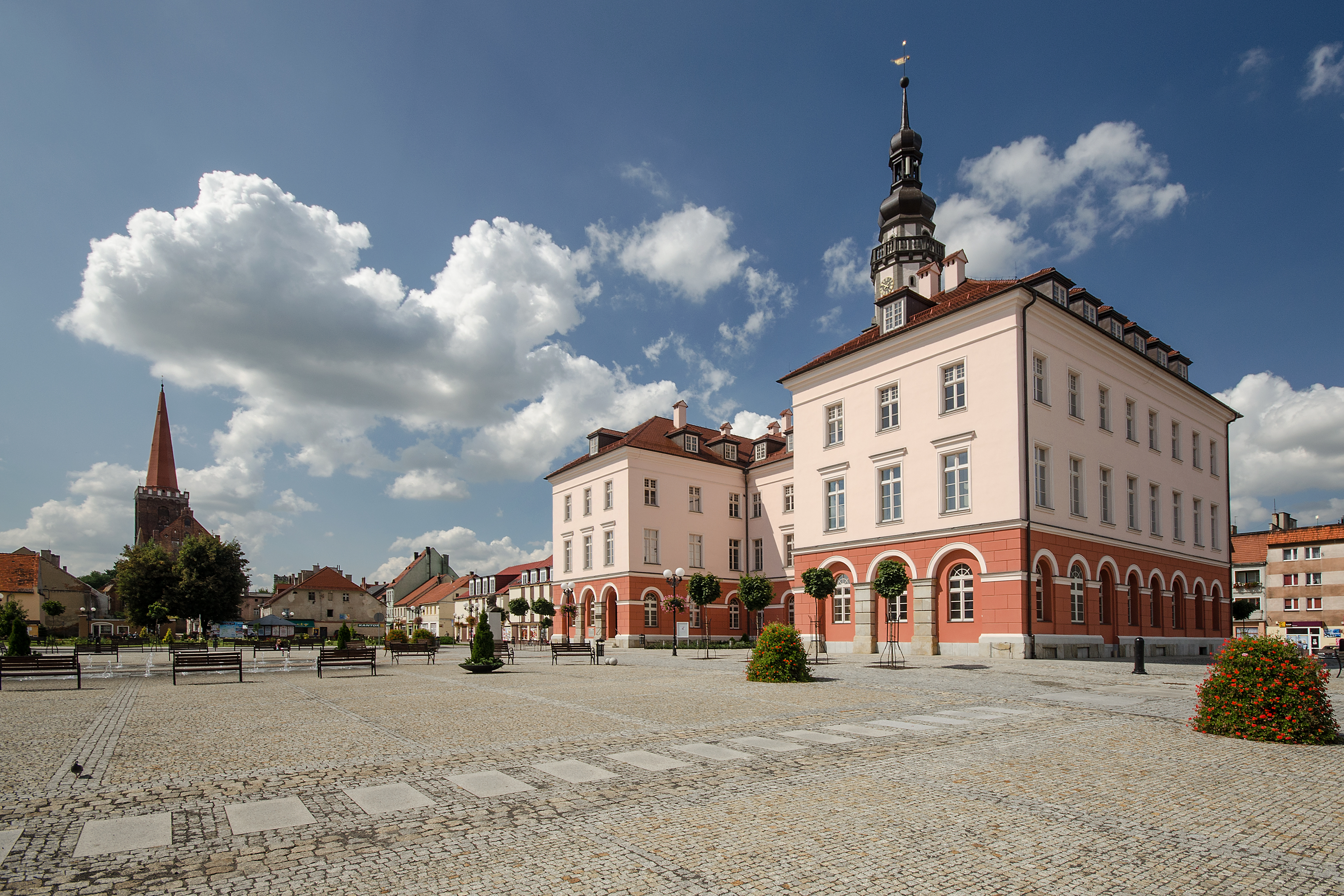
Grodków Town Hall from the southern side of the Market Square (Rynek).

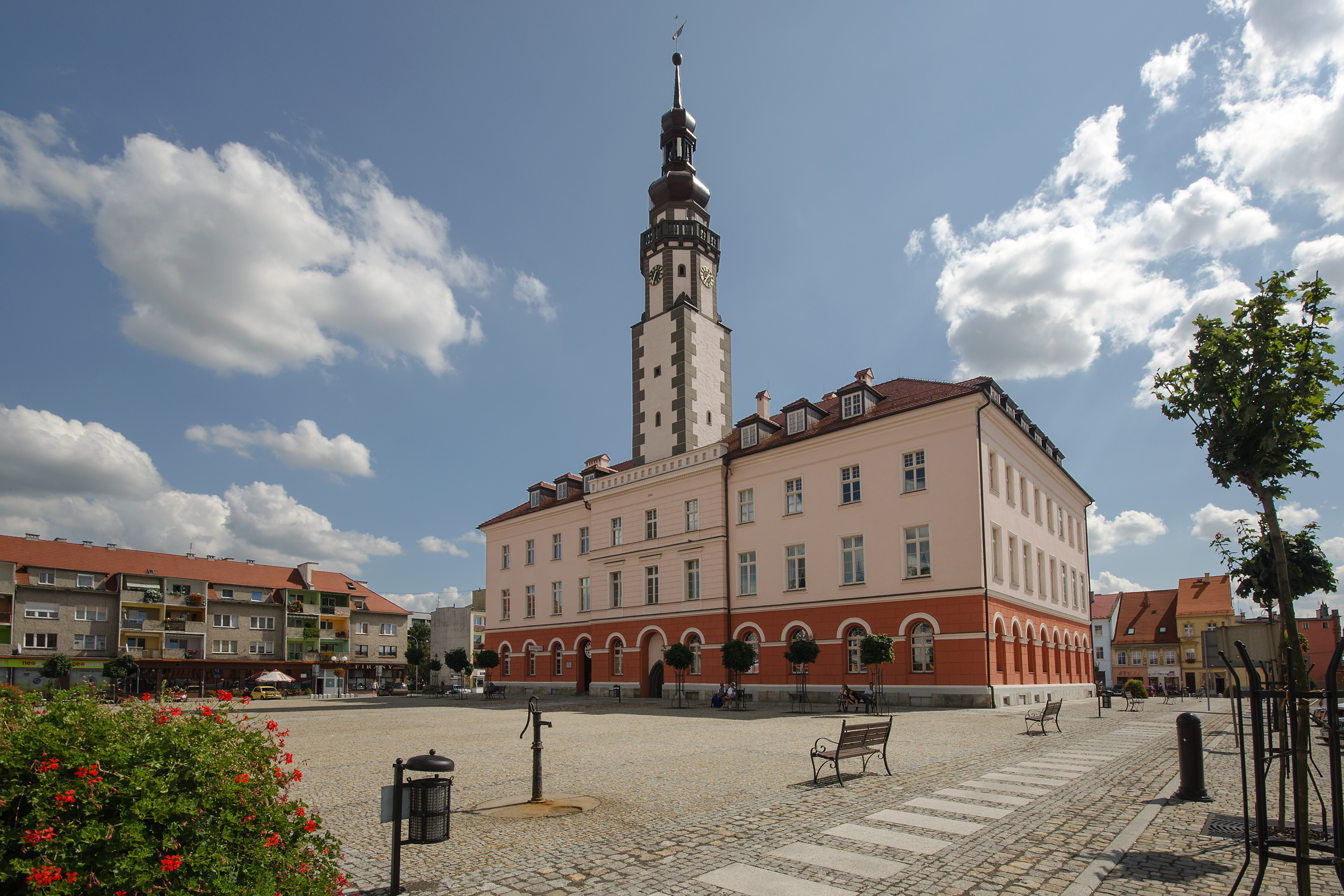
Grodków Town Hall from the northern side of the Market Square (Rynek).

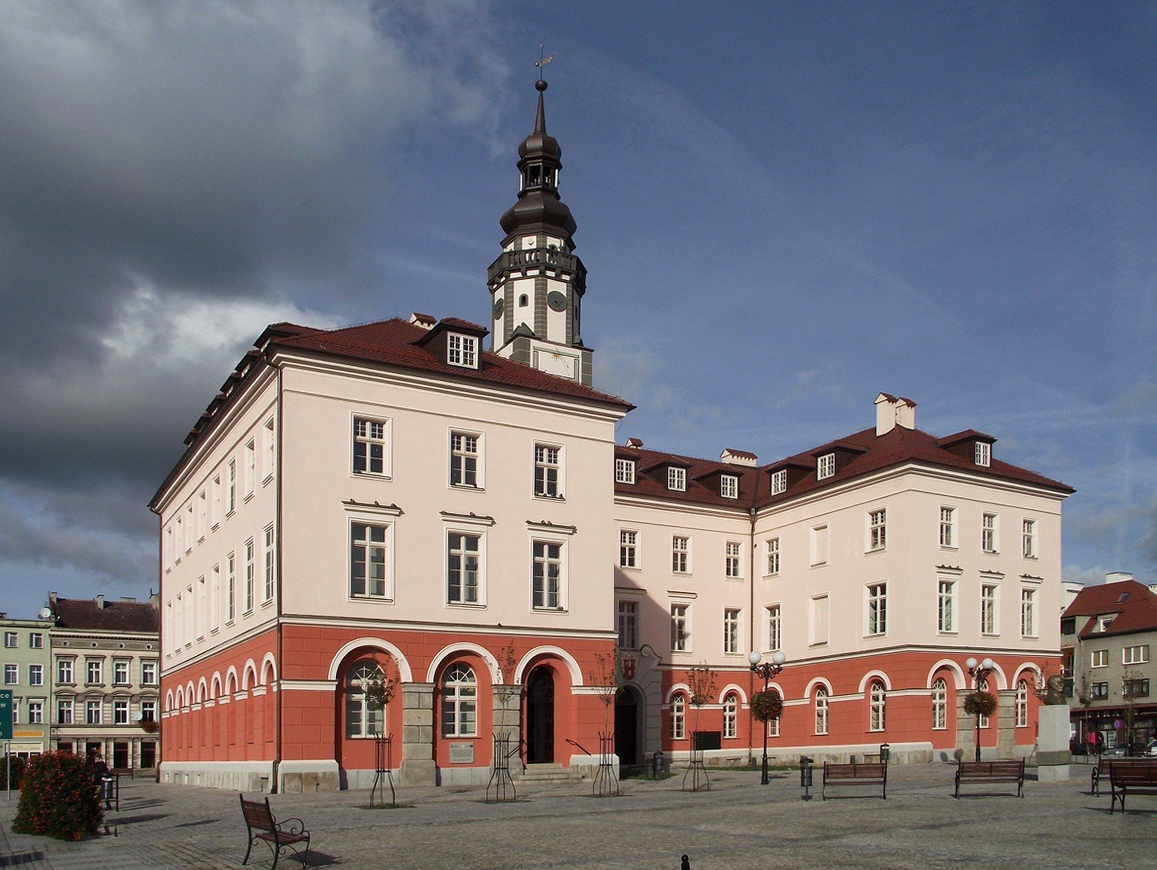
Grodków Town Hall with a fountain.
