= Sebastian von Rostock =

German bishop

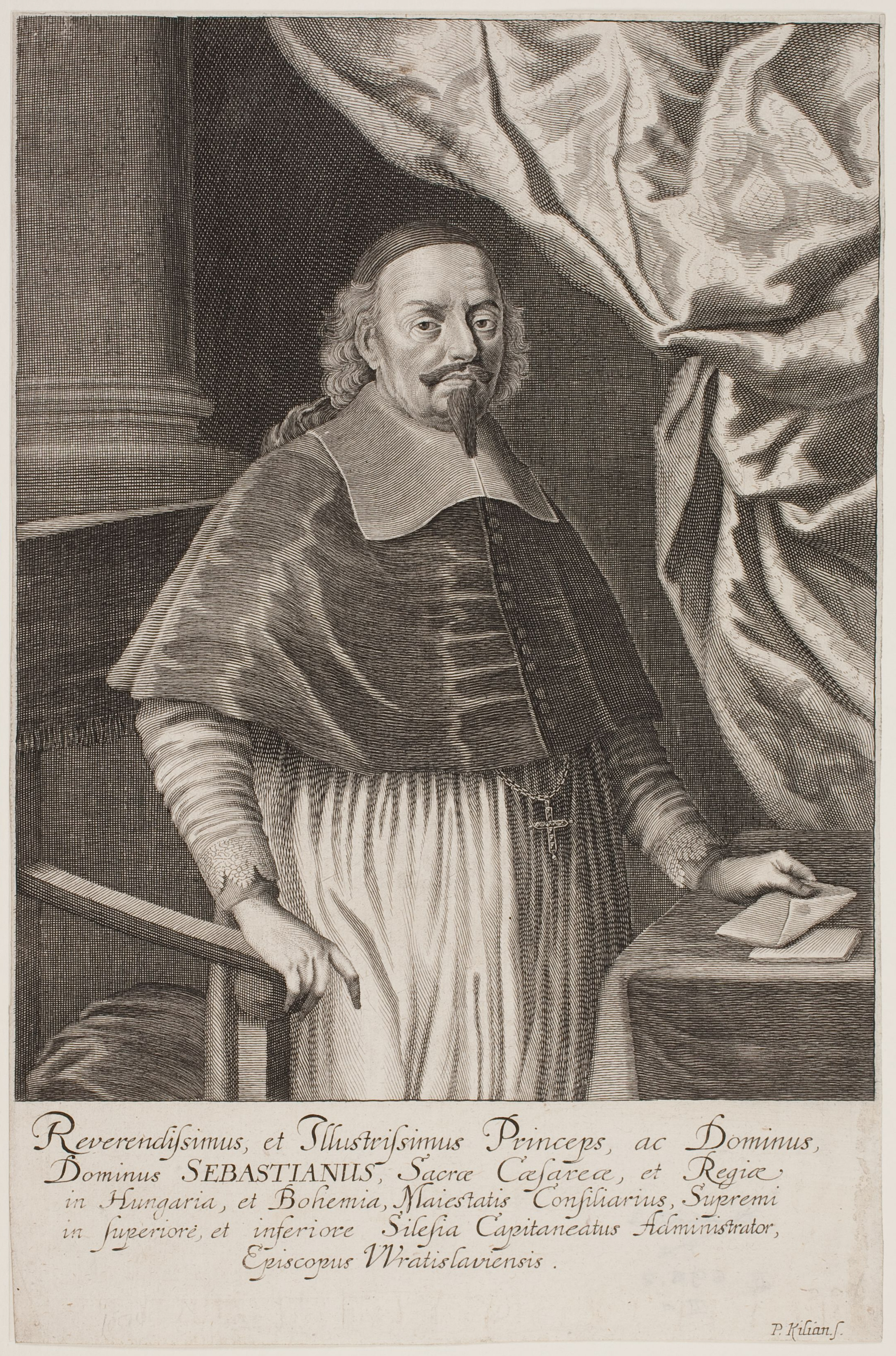
Sebastian von Rostock

Sebastian von Rostock (24 August 1607 – 9 June 1671) was a Roman Catholic Bishop of Breslau.

== Biography ==
He was born Nicolaus Bauckhe at Grottkau, Silesia, then a part of the Holy Roman Empire. His father, Sebastian, was a craftsman and his mother's name was Anna. He graduated school in Nysa and in the years 1627–1633 attended the Jesuit academy in Olomouc and studied classics at Neisse and from 1627 to 1633, philosophy and theology at Olomouc. After his ordination to the priesthood in 1633 he was assigned to pastoral duty at Neisse. When the Swedes captured the city in 1642, Rostock was taken prisoner and deported to Stettin. After his release he was ennobled by the Emperor, but remained pastor of Neisse until his transfer in 1649 to the cathedral of Breslau (Wrocław), where he spent the rest of his life.

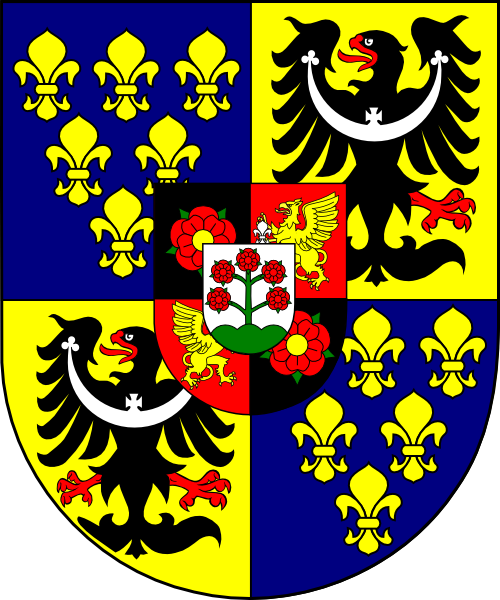
Sebastian of Rostock coat of arms

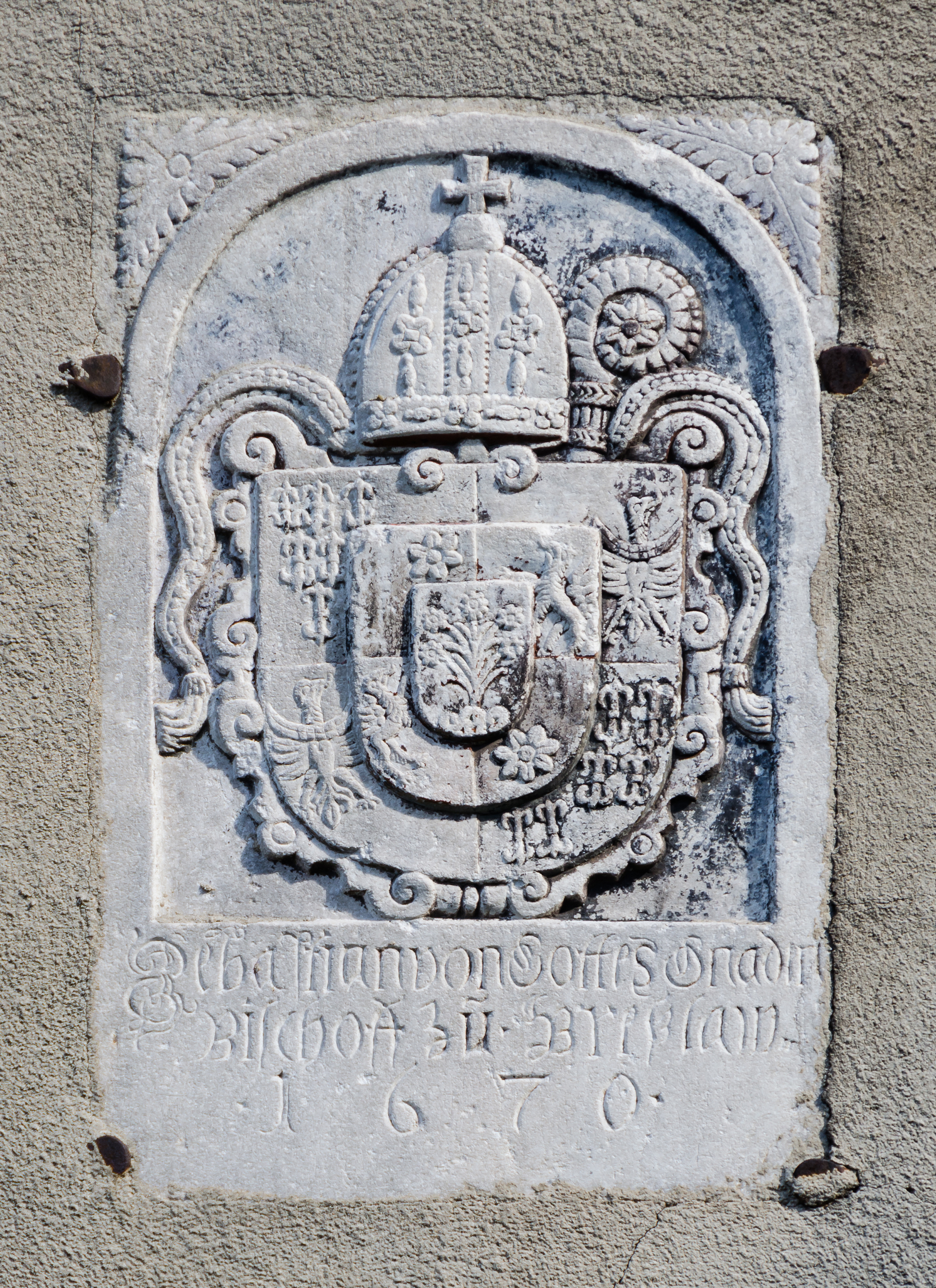
Sebastians coat of arms at bishops Mannor Nysa

Henceforth he played a prominent part in the administration of the diocese, and in 1653 was appointed vicar-general. It was largely through his efforts that the right of reformation (jus reformandi), granted the emperor by the Peace of Westphalia, was effectively exercised in the territory of Breslau. In all 656 Catholic churches which had been seized by the Protestants were restored to their former owners.

Considerable difficulty was experienced in providing suitable priests for these numerous churches. Rostock consecrated his life to the task, in spite of the almost uninterrupted absence from their diocese of the three bishops under whom he served. In 1645 Emperor Ferdinand III raised him to the rank of nobility. In 1664 he was himself elected bishop, and shortly after the civil administration of the district was also placed in his hands. He continued in work of Catholic reorganization, endeavoured to suppress the power of the Protestants over affairs of the Catholic Church and to neutralize the anti-Catholic influence of Protestant teachers.

As a bishop, he tried to recover Catholic churches taken by Protestants, improve the life and customs of the clergy, and improve education standards for priests. He died on 9 June 1671 in Breslau, and was buried in the Wrocław Cathedral.

He succumbed to an attack of apoplexy, superinduced by an imperial decree which suspended a decision that had been previously granted and which was favourable to Catholic interests.

Sebastian von Rostock Born: 24 August 1607 in Grottkau Died: 9 June 1671 in Breslau
Religious titles
Regnal titles
Preceded by Archduke Charles Joseph of Austria	Prince-Bishop of Wrocław; 1665–1671	Succeeded by Friedrich von Hessen-Darmstadt
