= Melchior Adam =

German literary historian

- Born: c. 1575; Grottkau, Nysa, Habsburg Silesia
- Died: 26 December 1622; Heidelberg

Melchior Adam (c. 1575 – 26 December 1622) was a German Calvinist literary historian.

== Life ==
Adam was born in Grottkau, Nysa, Habsburg Silesia (present-day Grodków, Opole Voivodeship). He visited the college in Brieg Brzeg, then studied on various academies with financial support of his benefactor Joachim von Berg. In 1601 he was appointed schoolmaster at the municipal school of Heidelberg, and later became co-rector and professor at the same institution. He died in Heidelberg.

== Works ==
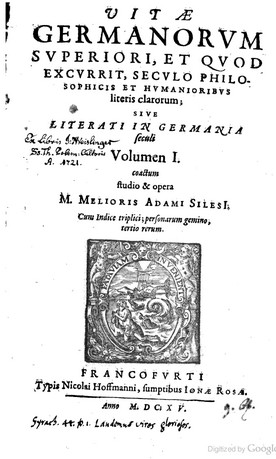
Vitae germanorum philosophorum, 1615

His major achievement consists of a collection of literary biographies, which were printed in Stuttgart and Heidelberg in five volumes: German Philosophers (including philologists, poets, mathematicians and physicists), German Theologians, Foreign Theologians, Jurists and Politicians and Medics. The figures discussed were arranged chronologically by their date of death, most of which lie between 1420 and 1620. His sources were biographical texts, personal records, funeral orations, letters and various academic records.

His 1615 Vitae Germanorum philosophorum (Lives of German philosophers) contains one of the earliest biographies of Nicolaus Copernicus.

He discussed Lutheran theologians in a deprecating manner, as he himself was a Calvinist.

== Bibliography ==
- Vitae Germanorum jureconsultorum et politicorum, qui superiore seculo, et quod excurrit, floruerunt Heidelberg 1611.Vitae Germanorum jureconsultorum et politicorum at Google Books
- Vitae Germanorum philosophorum … Frankfurt 1610 - Heidelberg 1615 Vitae Germanorum philosophorum at Google Books Vitae Germanorum philosophorum at the Internet Archive
- Decades duae continentes vitas theologorum exterorum principium. Frankfurt am Main 1618.
- Vitae Germanorum medicorum Heidelberg 1620
- Vitae Germanorum theologorum … Heidelberg 1620
- Vitae Germanorum iureconsultorum et politicorum Heidelberg 1620
- Apographum Monumentorum Haidelbergensium. Heidelberg 1612
- Disce mori oder Sterbekunst. Neustadt a. d. H. 1615
- Parodiae et metaphrases Horatianae. 1616

== Sources ==
Attribution

- Ernst Kelchner (1875). "Adam, Melchior". Allgemeine Deutsche Biographie (in German). Vol. 1. Leipzig: Duncker & Humblot. pp. 45–46.
- Chisholm, Hugh, ed. (1911). "Adam, Melchior" . Encyclopædia Britannica (11th ed.). Cambridge University Press.
