= Griechischer Geist aus Basler Pressen =

Griechischer Geist aus Basler Pressen ("Greek Spirit at the Basel Press") is an online catalogue of works which were originally written in Greek by ancient and patristic authors and which are among the holdings of the University of Basel's library. It is based on Frank Hieronymus's published catalogue (1992) of an exhibition by the same name, featuring more than 560 printed books from the 15th through the 17th centuries. It is a rich and sometimes unique source of information on the printers, editors, and commentators who flourished in and around Basel, including Hieronymus Froben, Heinrich Petri, and Desiderius Erasmus, and who contributed to the city's vitality as a Renaissance center of humanism and publishing.

The online catalogue features some 3,500 digital facsimiles of pages from the works discussed, making it useful also to researchers with little or no ability to read German. A significant number of the books represent the first known or surviving translation into Latin of an ancient Greek text. Entries may be searched (Wortsuche) by title or author, transliterated from Greek or in their Latinized form.
