= Meinhard III of Gorizia =

Meinhard I
- Count of Tyrol
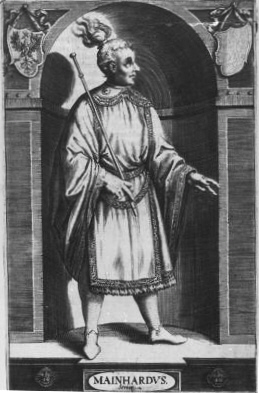
- 18th century depiction
- Count: 1253–1258
- Predecessor: Albert IV
- Successor: Meinhard II; Albert I of Gorizia
- Born: c. 1200/1205
- Died: 22 July 1258
- Buried: Tirol Castle
- Noble family: House of Gorizia
- Spouse: Adelaide of Tyrol
- Issue: Meinhard, Duke of Carinthia; Albert I of Gorizia
- Father: Engelbert III of Gorizia
- Mother: Matilda of Andechs

Meinhard III (c. 1200/1205 – 22 July 1258), a member of the House of Gorizia, was Count of Gorizia from 1231 and Count of Tyrol (as Meinhard I) from 1253 until his death.

== Life ==
He was the son of Count Engelbert III of Gorizia and his wife Matilda, daughter of Berthold I of Istria and sister of the powerful Andechs duke Berthold IV of Merania. Through his mother, Meinhard inherited the County of Mittelburg in central Istria. His father died in 1220, nevertheless he did not come in control over all his family's possessions around Lienz and Gorizia upon the death of his uncle Count Meinhard the Elder. About 1237 he married Adelaide (Adelheid), one of the two daughters of Count Albert IV of Tyrol, attended with reasonable succession prospects in the Tyrolean lands.

Meinhard strongly supported the Hohenstaufen emperor Frederick II in his fierce conflict with Pope Innocent IV and in return was appointed Imperial governor of the Duchy of Styria and the March of Carniola after the last Babenberg duke Frederick the Warlike had died without heirs in 1246. From 1250 onwards also governor in the princeless Duchy of Austria, Meinhard facing the fall of the Hohenstaufen dynasty did not prevail: his rule in Carniola was challenged by the Carinthian ducal House of Sponheim, and in Austria and Styria he was expelled by the Bohemian prince Ottokar II Přemysl in 1251.

During the turmoil after the death of Emperor Frederick II, Count Meinhard, backed by his father-in-law Albert IV of Tyrol, tried to gain control over the Duchy of Carinthia but failed in an unsuccessful campaign against Duke Bernhard von Spanheim and his son Philip, the elected Archbishop of Salzburg. On 8 September 1252, he was finally defeated and arrested at Greifenburg. According to the Peace of Lieserhofen, concluded on 27 December 1252, he had to give his sons Meinhard IV and Albert to Archbishop Philip as hostages. Both were imprisoned at Hohenwerfen Castle in Salzburg and not released until 1258. Meinhard and Albert IV of Tyrol also had to pay a compensation and to renounce certain possessions including Mittersill, Virgen, Matrei and Oberdrauburg.

Upon the death of Count Albert IV of Tyrol in 1253, Meinhard and his brother-in-law, Count Gebhard of Hirschberg, split Tyrol, of which Meinhard took the southern part with Meran, in constant quarrels with the Trento bishops. His son Meinhard II later also acquired the Hirschberg lands from Gebhard's heirs in 1284 and two years later even received Carinthia from the hands of the Habsburg king Rudolf I of Germany.

Meinhard I died in 1258 and is buried at Tirol Castle.

== Marriage and children ==
About 1237, Meinhhard married Adelaide, daughter of Albert IV, Count of Tyrol. They had four known children:

- Adelheid († 1291), married Count Frederick I of Ortenburg
- Meinhard II (1238–1295), Count of Gorizia and Tyrol, Duke of Carinthia
- Albert I († 1304), Count of Gorizia
- Bertha († 1267), married Conrad, Count of Wullenstetten

Meinhard III of Gorizia House of Gorizia Born: c. 1200/1205 Died: January or February 1258
Preceded by Meinhard II	Count of Gorizia; 1231–1258	Succeeded by Meinhard IV and Albert I
Preceded by Albert IV	Count of Tyrol; 1253–1258	Succeeded by Meinhard IV and Albert I
Preceded by Otto I of Eberstein	Captain of Styria; 1248–1250	Succeeded by Stephen Gutkeled
