= Pazin Castle =

- Pazin, Istria County, Croatia
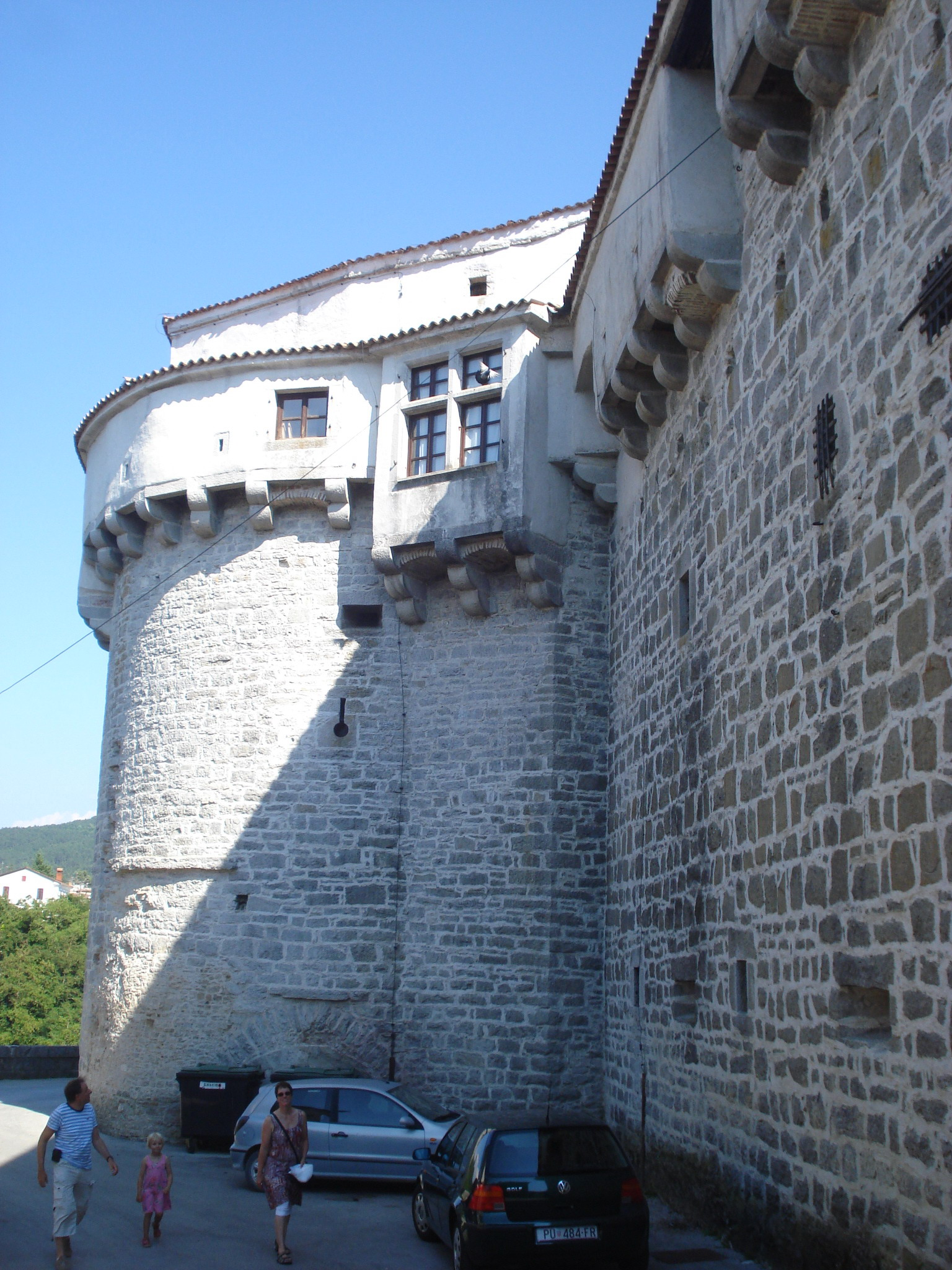
- Round tower of the Pazin Castle

Site information
- Type: Rock castle
- Controlled by: Meinhard I, Count of Gorizia (d. 1142), Meinhard, Margrave of Istria (d. 1193) and his successors, House of Habsburg (from 1374), Antonio Laderchi of Montecuccoli and his successors (1766-1945)
- Open to the public: Town Museum
- Condition: preserved

Location
- Coordinates: 45.2403°N 13.9306°E

Site history
- Built: 10th century (?)
- Built by: (unknown)
- Materials: hewn stone (ashlar)

The Pazin Castle (Croatian: Kaštel Pazin Italian: Castello di Pisino, German: Mitterburg) is a medieval fortification built on a solid rock situated in the middle of the town of Pazin, the administrative seat of Istria County, Croatia. It is the largest and best-preserved castle in that westernmost Croatian county.

It overlooks the deep gorge of the Pazinčica Foiba river, a small karst subterranean river that disappears there through sinkhole and continues underground.

The fortified structure was constructed of hewn stone, and, during its 11-century-long history, subjected to several major reconstructions and renovations. There are two museums to be visited in Pazin's castle, the Ethnographic Museum of Istria and the Pazin Town Museum.

== History ==
The Pazin Castle was first mentioned as Castrum Pisinum on 7 June 983 in a document issued by Otto II, Holy Roman Emperor, confirming the possession of the castle to the bishop of Poreč. In the 12th century the bishops of Poreč ceded it to Meinhard of Schwarzenburg, owner of Črnigrad Castle (German: Schwarzenburg), then to Meinhard I, Count of Gorizia, and finally to Meinhard, Margrave of Istria (d. 1193) and his successors.

In 1374 Albert IV, Margrave of Gorizia, died without successors and the castle was inherited by the members of the House of Habsburg. They rented or mortgaged it many times during the next few centuries to various noblemen closely related to them, among which were members of families Auersperg, Barbo, Della Torre, Devinski, Durr (Dürrer), Eggenberg, Flangini, Fugger, Khevenhüller, Mosconi, Swetkowitz, Turinetti de Prie and Walsee.

The castle was finally sold to Antonio Laderchi de Montecuccoli in 1766 for 240 florins and remained the property of his family until 1945. In the meantime, various countries around the castle changed many times over the last more than 200 years: after the end of the Venetian Republic in 1797, Pazin belonged to the Habsburg monarchy, then to Napoleon's French Empire, again to the Habsburg Monarchy, in 1918 to Italy, in 1945 to Yugoslavia, and in 1991 to Croatia.

For many centuries the castle was the administrative seat of the County of Pazin (Croatian: Pazinska grofovija/Pazinska knežija; Italian: Contado di Pisino; German: Grafschaft Mitterburg) or County of Istria (Croatian: Istarska grofovija/Istarska knežija; Italian: Contea d' Istria; German: Grafschaft Isterreich), governed either by a castle captain castellan, or the count himself.

== See also ==
- List of museums in Croatia

== Gallery ==
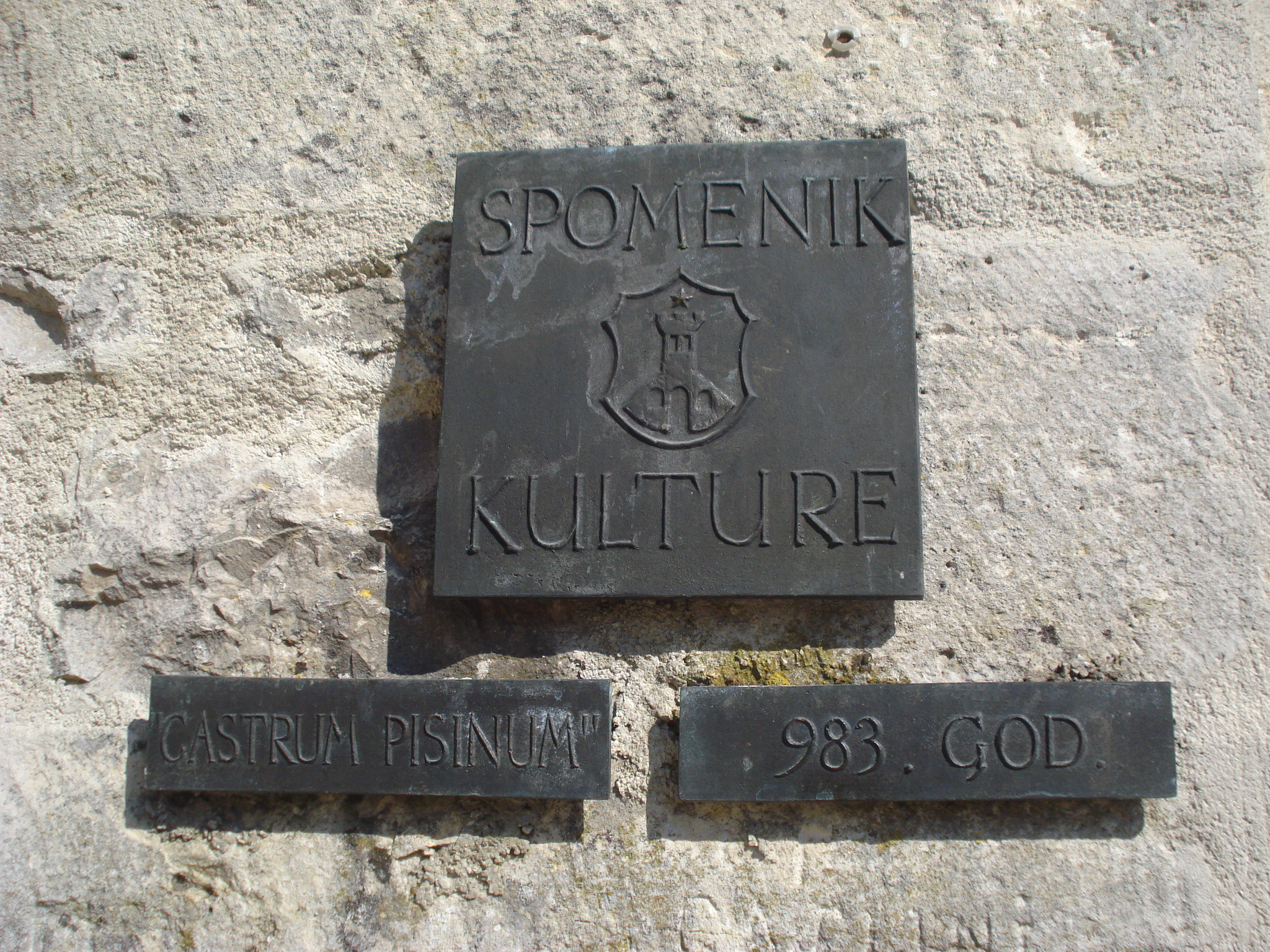
Entrance plaque of the castle

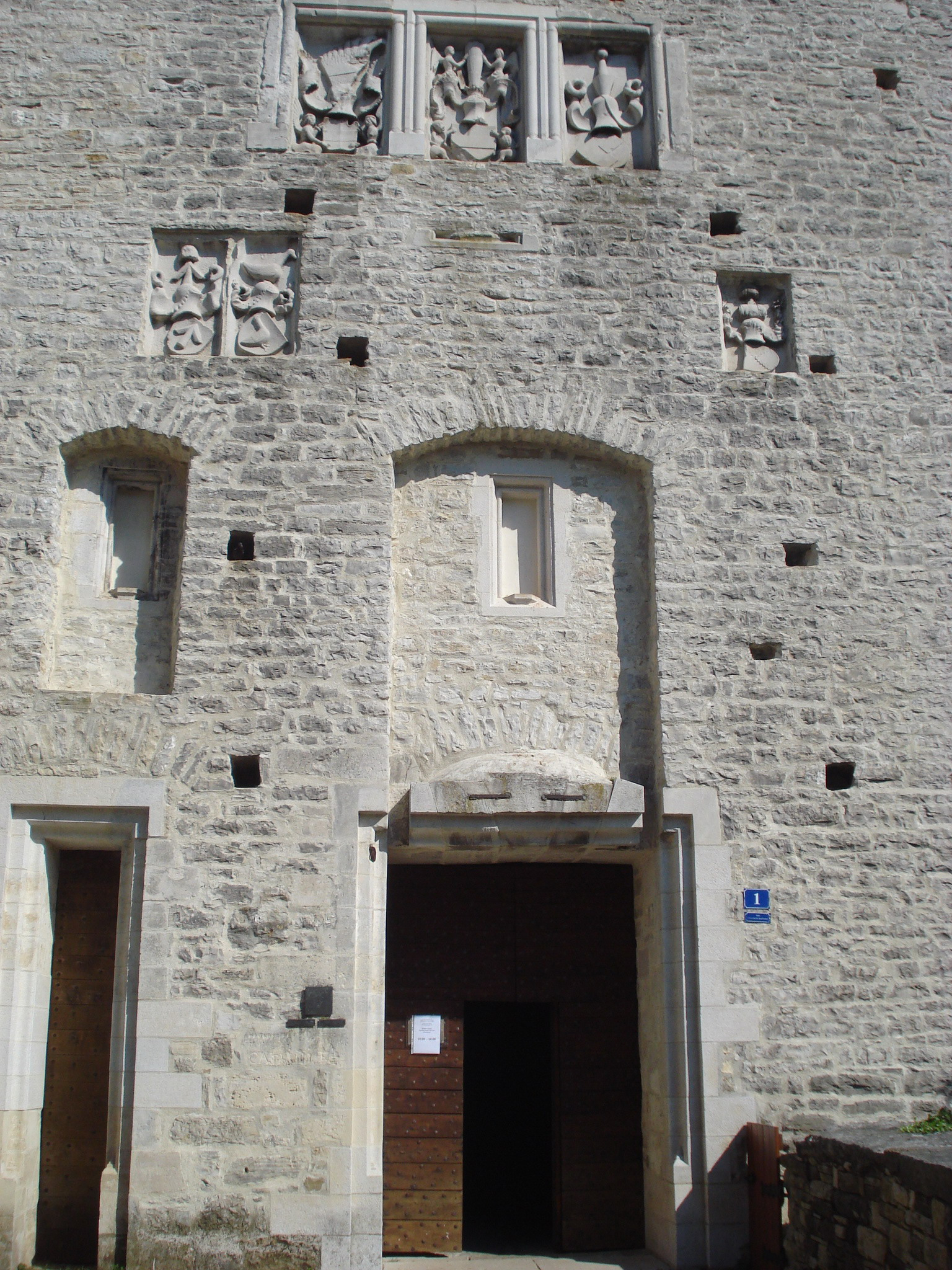
Entrance door with several coats of arms of the former owners

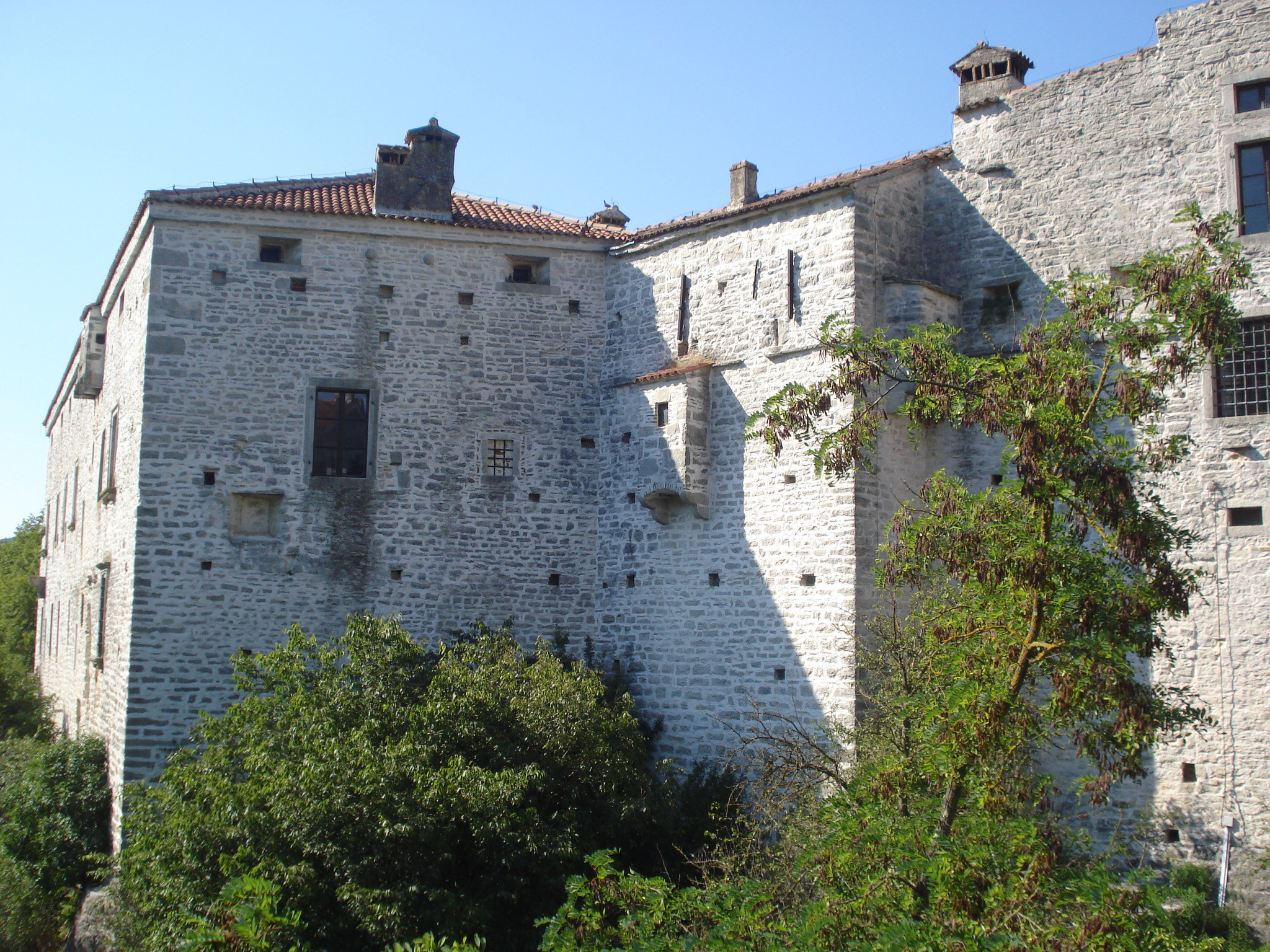
Southeast side of the castle

== See also ==
- List of castles in Croatia
- Timeline of Croatian history
- Military history of Croatia
- House of Montecuccoli
