= Meinhard II =

Meinhard II may refer to:

- Meinhard II, Count of Gorizia (died 1231)
- Meinhard II, Count of Tyrol (died 1295), also Count of Gorizia and Duke of Carinthia
- Meinhard II, Count of Ortenburg (died 1337)
