= Krasna zemljo =

National anthem

English: Beautiful Country
- Regional anthem of Istria Croatia
- Also known as: Terra bellisima
- Lyrics: Ivan Cukon
- Music: Matko Brajša Rašan
- Adopted: 2002

Lyrics of the song "Krasna zemljo" ("Beautiful Land"; Italian: Terra bellissima) were written by Ivan Cukon in 1912, and the music was composed by Matko Brajša Rašan. The song was written as the Hymn of the Company Saints Cyril and Methodius and later became an unofficial anthem of the region of Istria.

As the song was widely accepted as the anthem of the region, the assembly of the Istria County proclaimed the song as the regional anthem of Istria on 23 September 2002. Despite Istria has officially adopted Croatian-Italian bilingualism, the anthem is only sung in Croatian.

== Official lyrics ==
=== Krasna zemljo ===
Krasna zemljo, Istro mila
dome roda hrvatskog
Kud se ori pjesan vila,
s Učke tja do mora tvog.

Glas se čuje oko Raše,
čuje Mirna, Draga, Lim
Sve se diže što je naše
za rod gori srcem svim.

Slava tebi Pazin - grade
koj' nam čuvaš rodni kraj
Divne li ste, oj Livade
nek' vas mine tuđi sjaj!

Sva se Istra širom budi
Pula, Buzet, Lošinj, Cres
Svud pomažu dobri ljudi
nauk žari kano krijes.

== English Translation ==
Dear Istria, beautiful land
home of the Croatian kin
Where the song of fairies sounds
from Učka to your sea.

The voice is heard throughout the Raša,
heard by Mirna, Draga, Lim
Everything is rising that is ours,
its heart burning for its kin

Glory to you Pazin - city
you that guard our birthplace
You're beautiful, oh Livade
let others shine cease upon you

all of Istria is waking up,
Pula, Buzet, Lošinj, Cres
everywhere the good people are helping,
knowledge is glowing like embers

== External links and references ==
- Istria County - the official page about the anthem
