= Meinhard I of Gorizia =

Count of Gorizia, Count Palatine in Carinthia

Meinhard I
- Count of Gorizia
- Coat of arms of the Counts of Gorizia, Ingeram Codex, 1459
- Born: c. 1070
- Died: 1142
- Noble family: House of Gorizia (Meinhardiner)
- Spouses: Hildegard; Elisabeth of Schwarzenburg
- Issue: Engelbert II, Count of Gorizia
- Father: Meginhard, Count in the Puster Valley
- Mother: Diemut of Spanheim

Meinhard I (c. 1070 – 1142), an ancestor of the noble House of Gorizia (Meinhardiner dynasty), was a Count of Gorizia in the first half of the 12th century. He also held the offices of a Count palatine in the Duchy of Carinthia as well as Vogt governor of the Patriarchate of Aquileia and of St Peter Abbey in the March of Istria.

== Life ==
Meinhard was the son of Meginhard, Count of Lurn, and Diemut of Spanheim. His family was of noble Bavarian origin; Meinhard's father Meginhard is documented as a count in the Bavarian Puster Valley in 1107. The dynasty had been able to acquire large estates in the newly established Patria del Friuli, among them the castle of Gorizia (Görz) as their new ancestral seat. In 1090 Meinhard's elder brother Engelbert I (d. 1122) succeeded their father as ruler over the Puster Valley and Gorizia possessions and in 1099 was appointed Bavarian Count palatine by Emperor Henry IV. In 1102 he also assumed the office of a Vogt of Millstatt Abbey from the Aribonid dynasty related by marriage.

Meinhard is mentioned for the first time as a Count of Gorizia in 1117. At that time, his estates consisted of the Upper Puster Valley estates, from Innichen Abbey to below Lienz in the west, and the lands around Gorizia in Friuli, which later formed the core of the immediate County of Gorizia, as well as parts of Istria, including Pazin.

== Marriages and issue ==
Meinhard's first marriage, with Hildegard, was childless.

From his second marriage, with Elisabeth, a daughter of Count Botho of Schwarzenburg in the Bavarian Nordgau, he had four children:

- Henry II (d. 1150), succeeded his father as Count of Gorizia, remained childless
- Engelbert II (d. 1191), married Adelaide, daughter of Count Otto I of Scheyern, succeeded his brother as Count of Gorizia, Margrave of Istria from 1188
- Meinhard (d. 1193), Margrave of Istria, married Adelaide, a daughter of Count Albert of Ballenstedt, from the Saxon House of Ascania
- Beatrix, nun at the Benedictine monastery of S. Maria in Aquileia, remained unmarried

== Sources ==
- Štih, Peter (2010). The Middle Ages between the Eastern Alps and the Northern Adriatic. Brill.

Meinhard I of Gorizia Meinhardiner Born: c. 1070 Died: 1142
Preceded by Engelbert I	Count of Gorizia; 1122-1142	Succeeded by Henry II
