= Engelbert III =

Engelbert III may refer to:

- Engelbert III, Margrave of Istria (died 1173)
- Engelbert III, Count of Gorizia (died 1220)
- Engelbert III of the Marck, Archbishop of Cologne (1304–1368)
- Engelbert III of the Mark (1333–1391)
