= Lim Fjord =

Lim Fjord can be the name of two different geographical features:

- The Limfjord in Denmark, since 1825 part of a channel separating the island of Vendsyssel-Thy from the rest of Jutland.
- The Lim fjord in Croatia, an estuary on the western coast of Istria which is not a real fjord but a ria.
