= Meinhard I =

Meinhard I may refer to:

- Meinhard I, Count of Gorizia (died 1142)
- Meinhard I, Count of Tyrol (died 1258), also Count of Gorizia
- Meinhard I, Count of Ortenburg (died 1332)
