= Istria County =

County in western Croatia

Coordinates: 45°14′21″N 13°56′19″E

Istria County Istarska županija (Croatian) Regione istriana (Italian)
- County
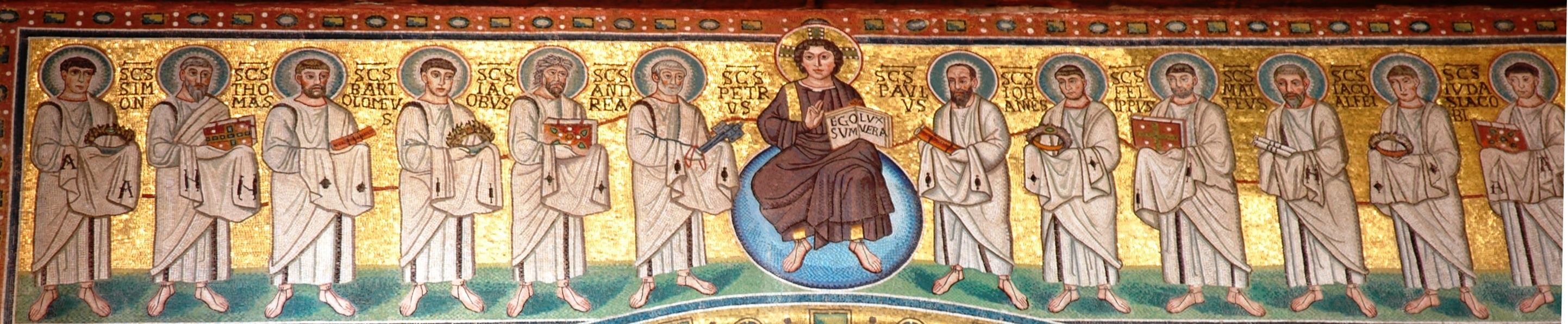
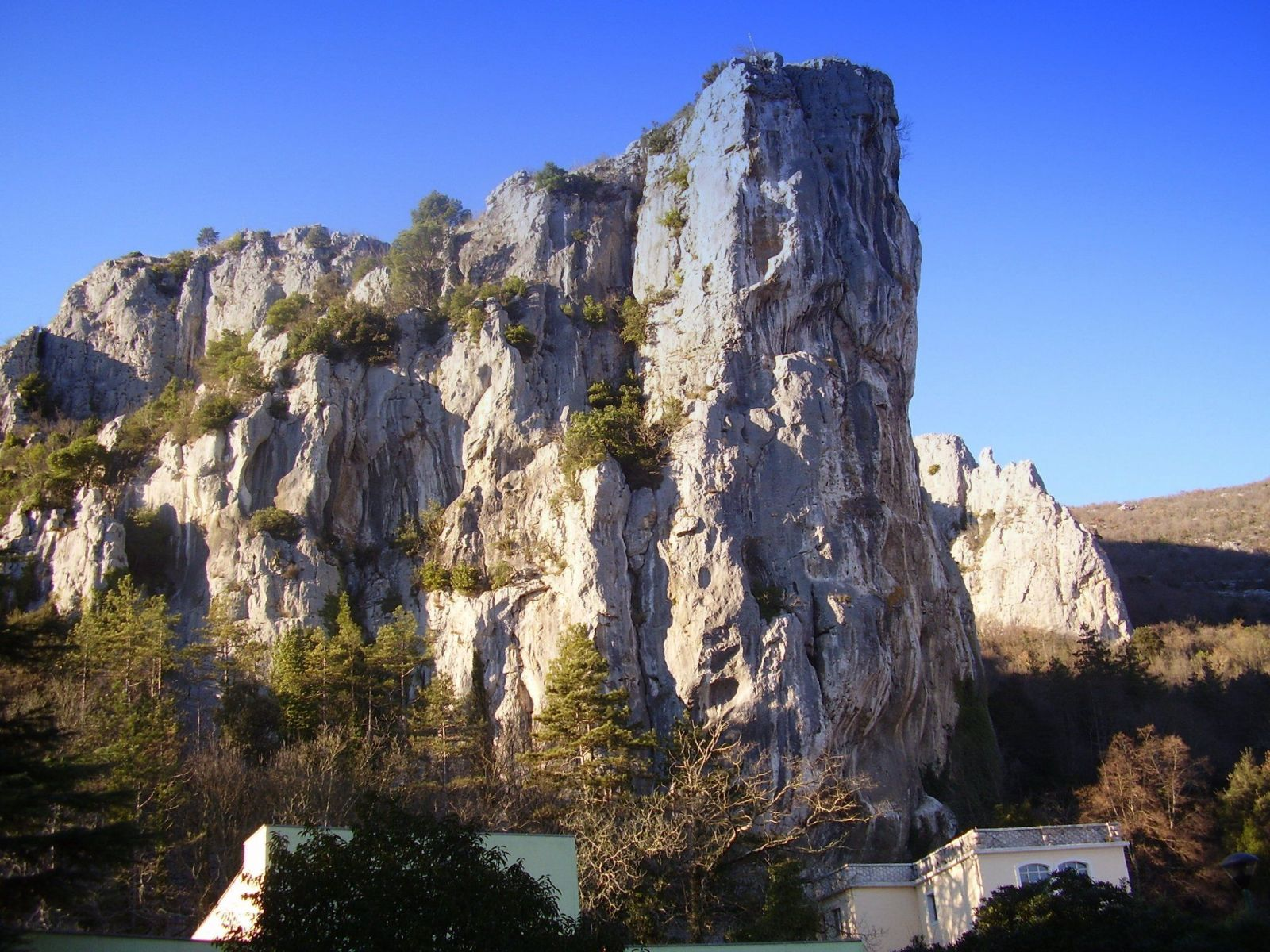
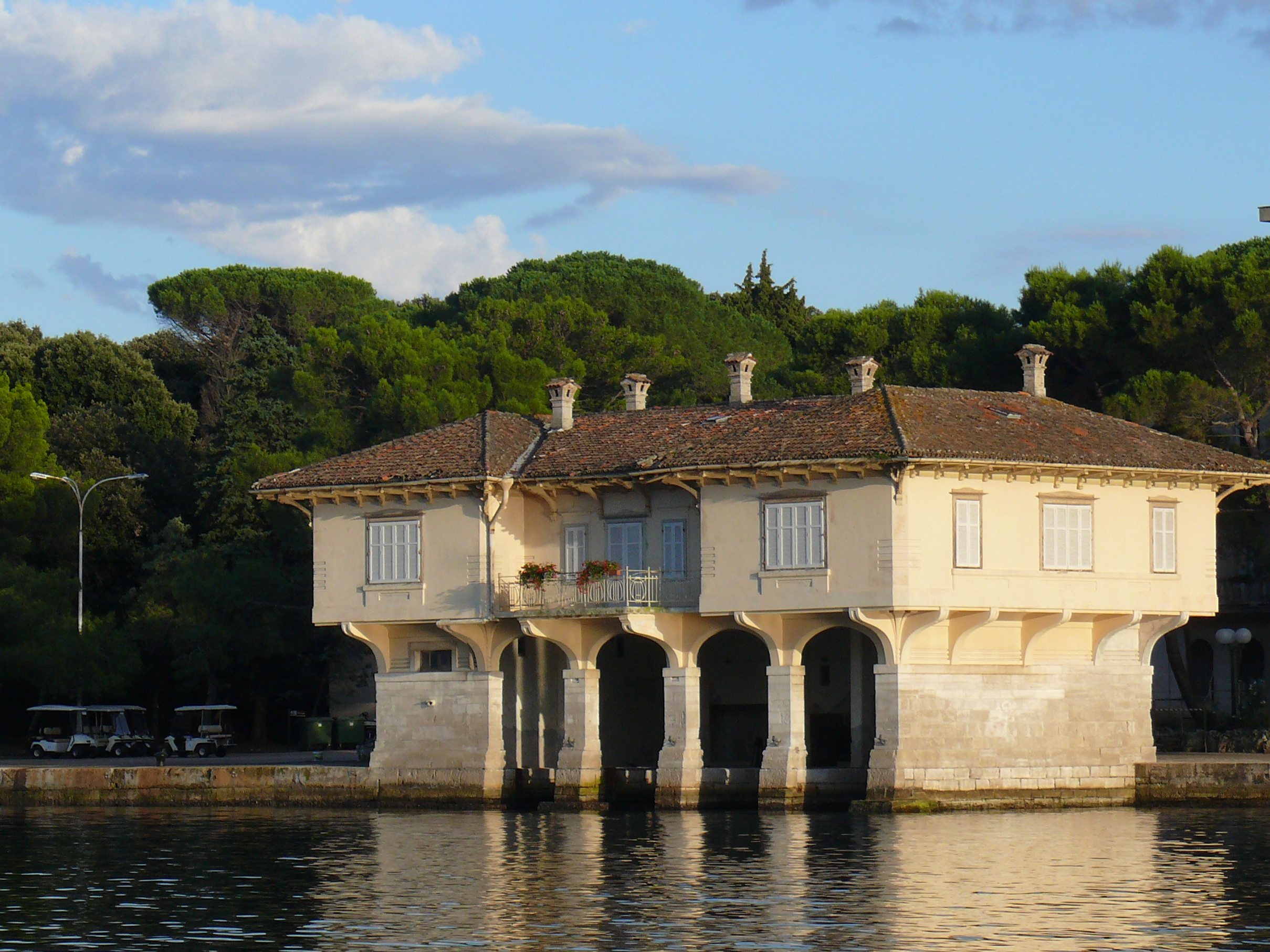
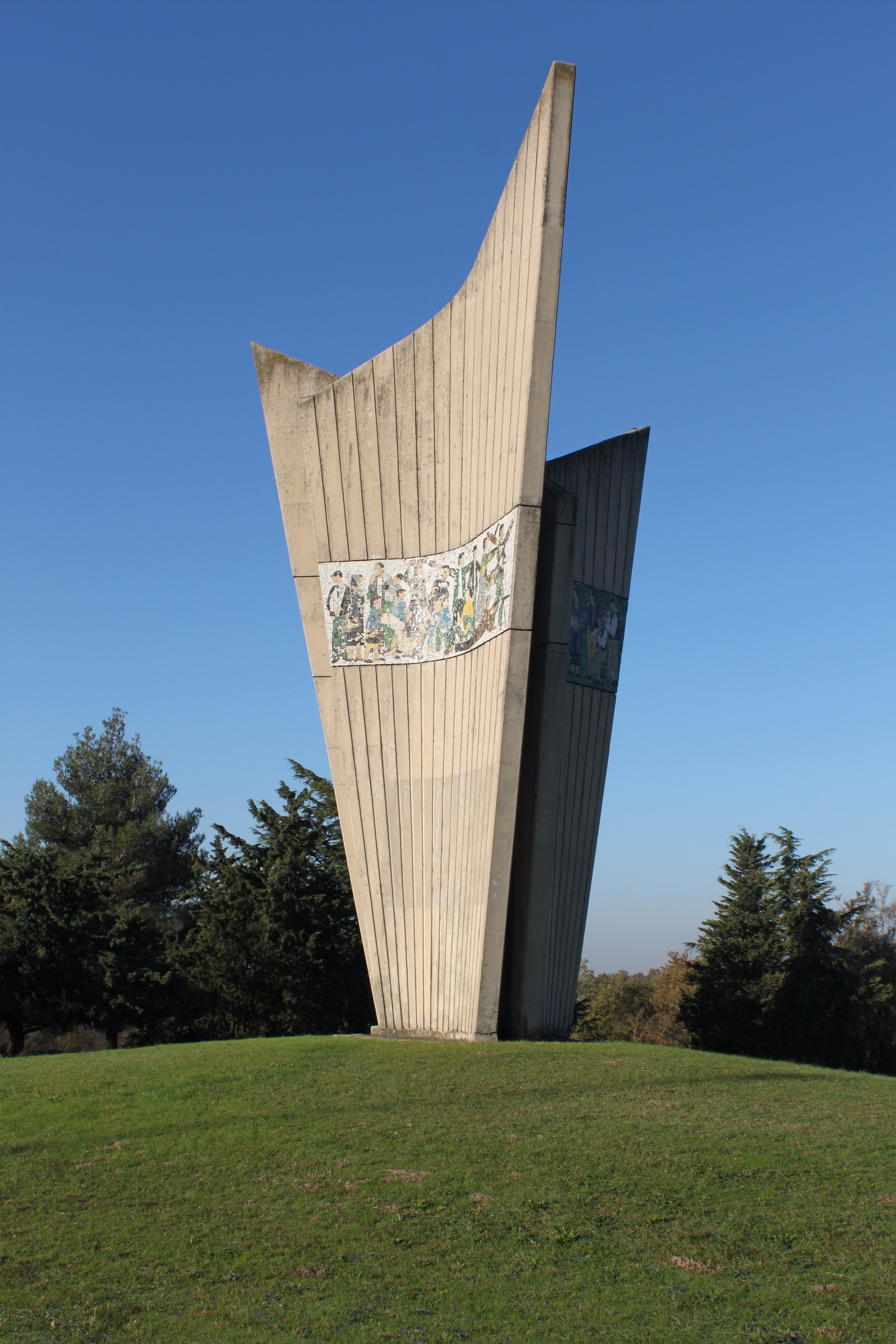
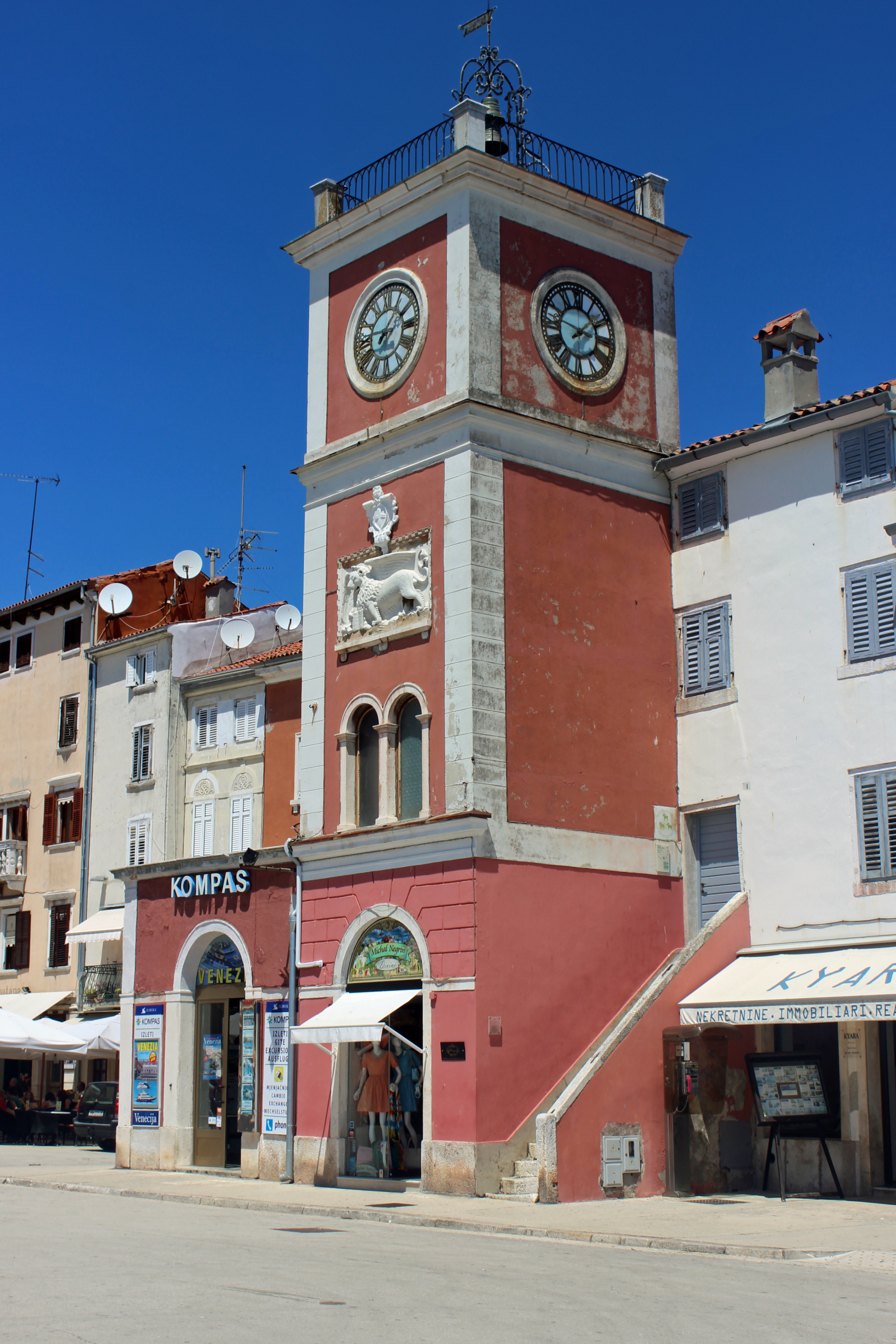
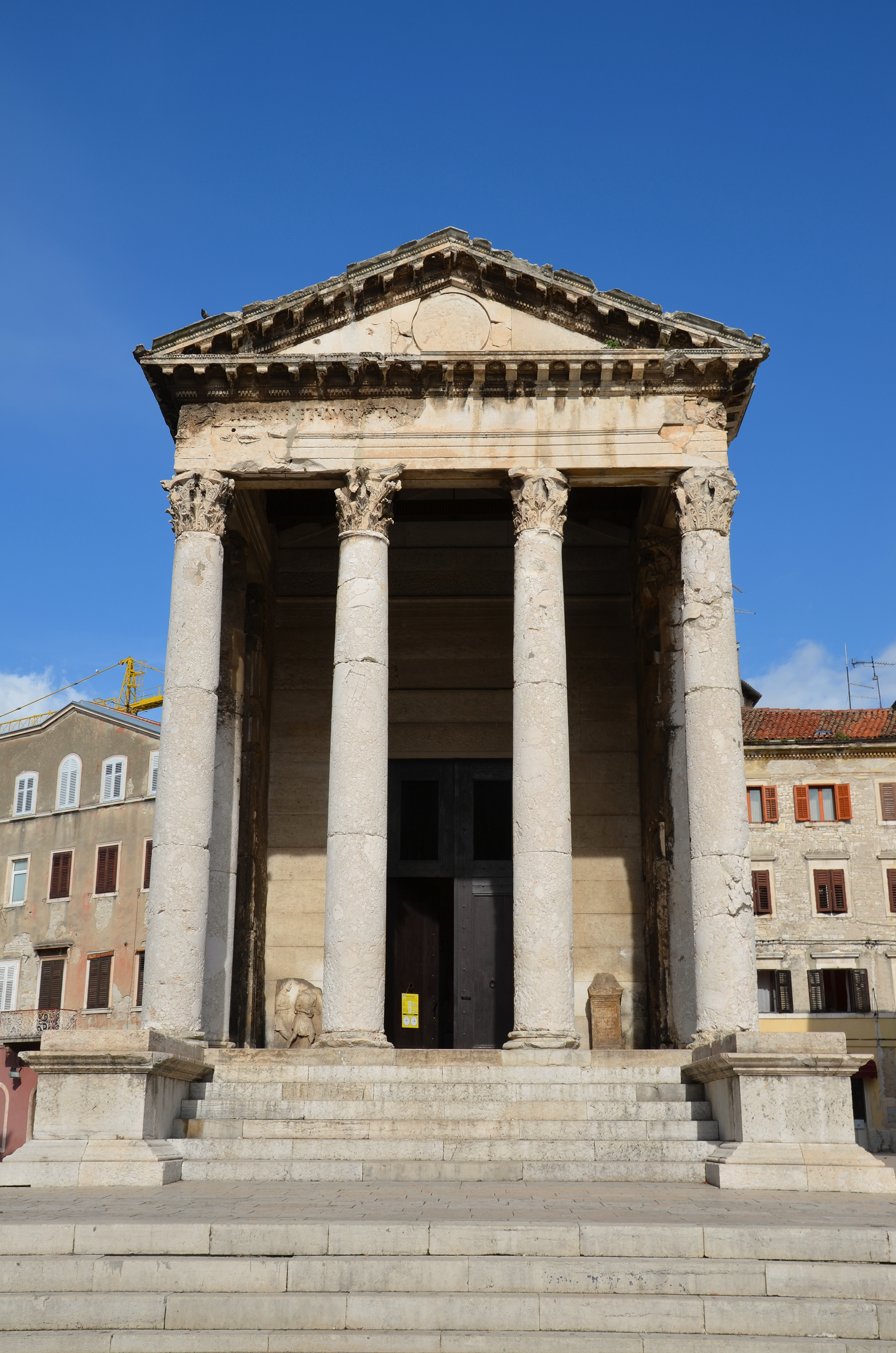
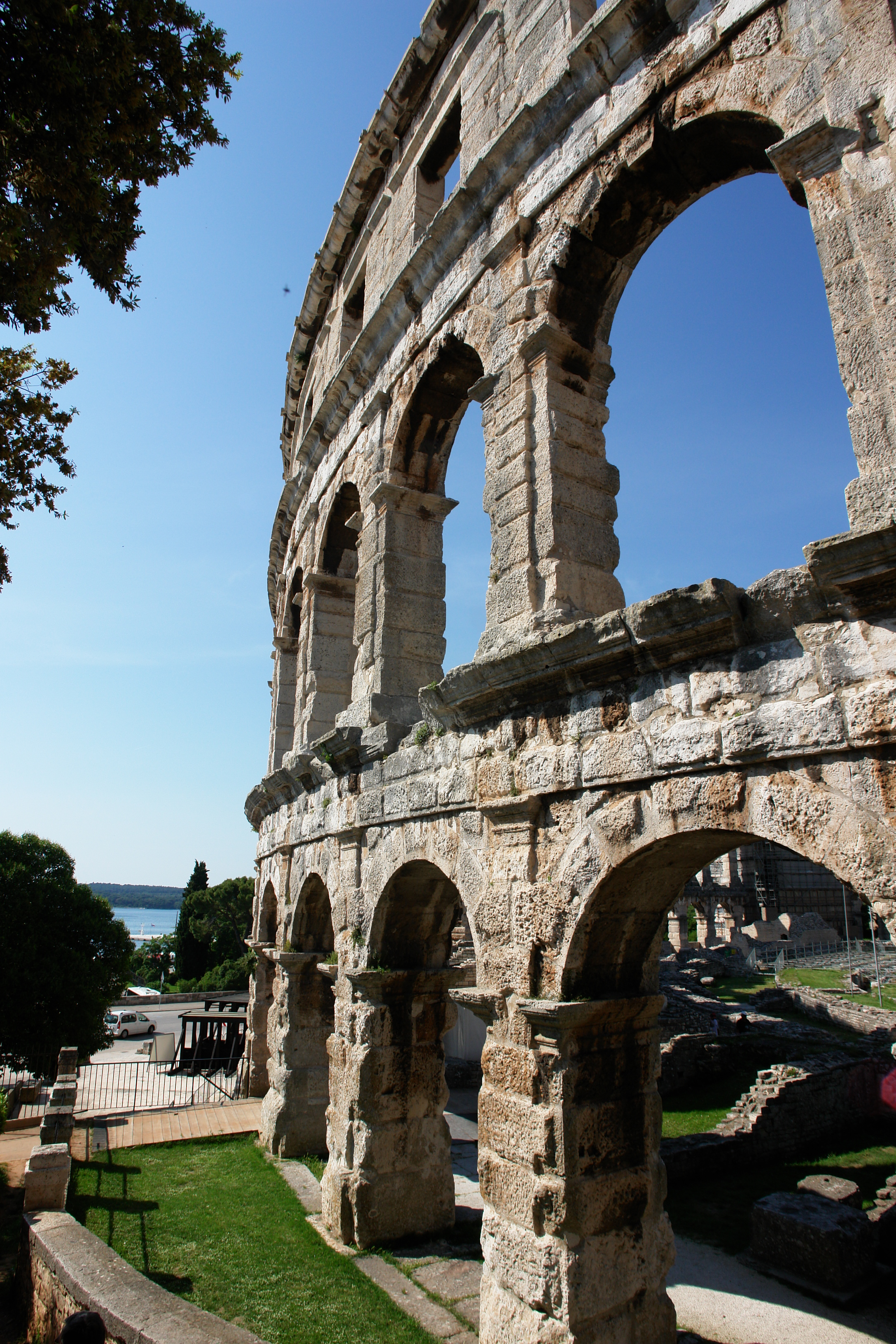
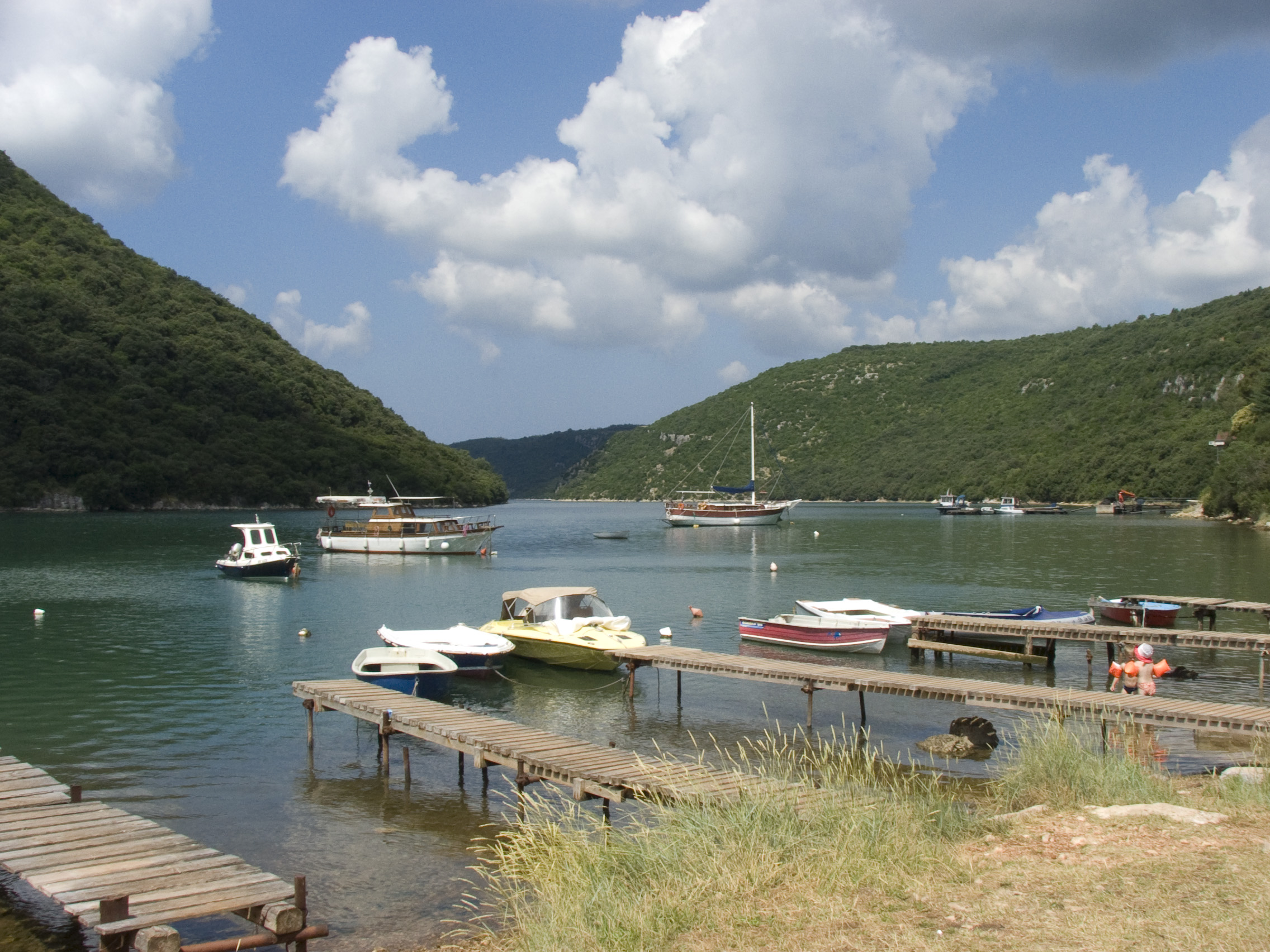
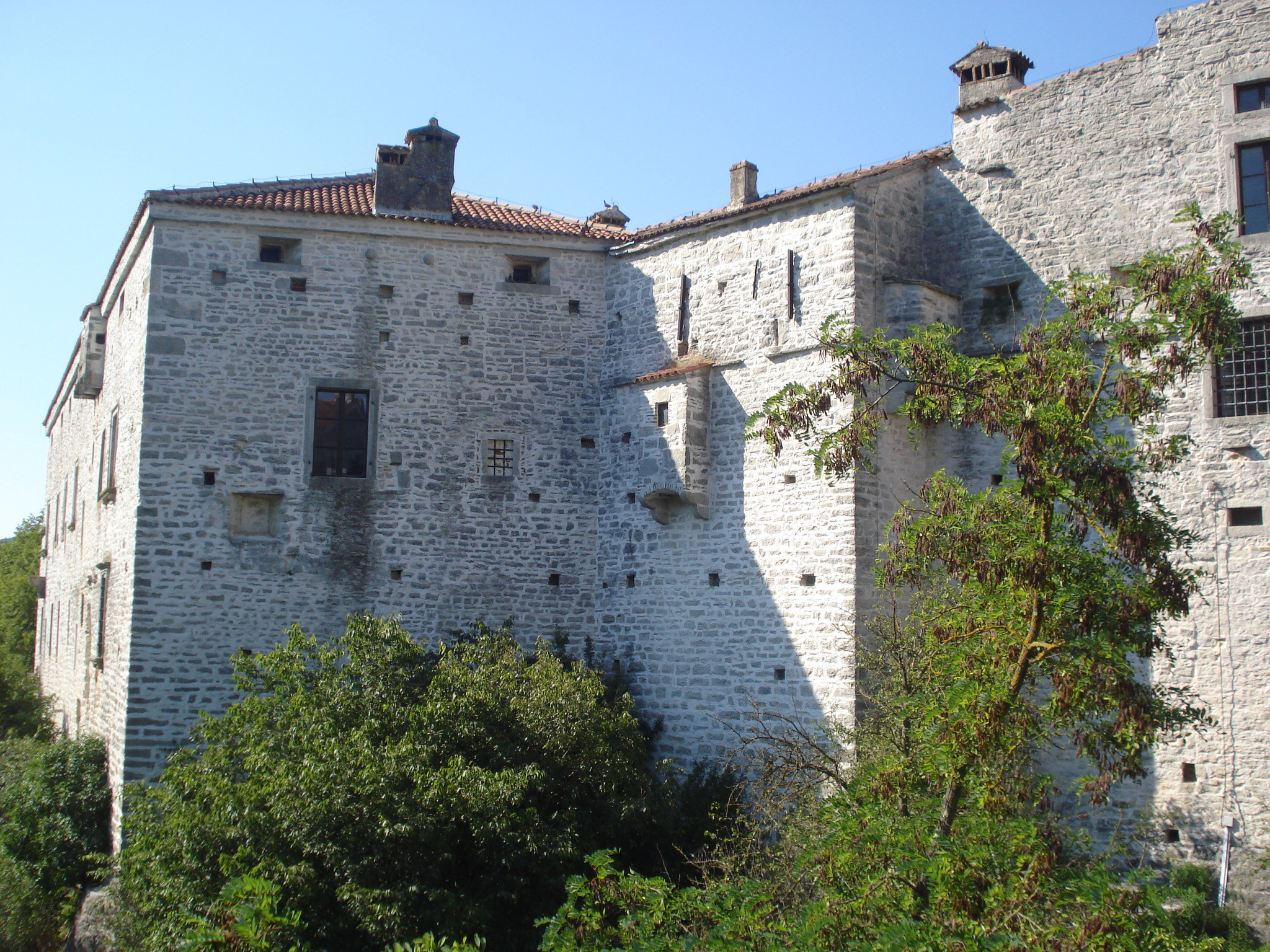
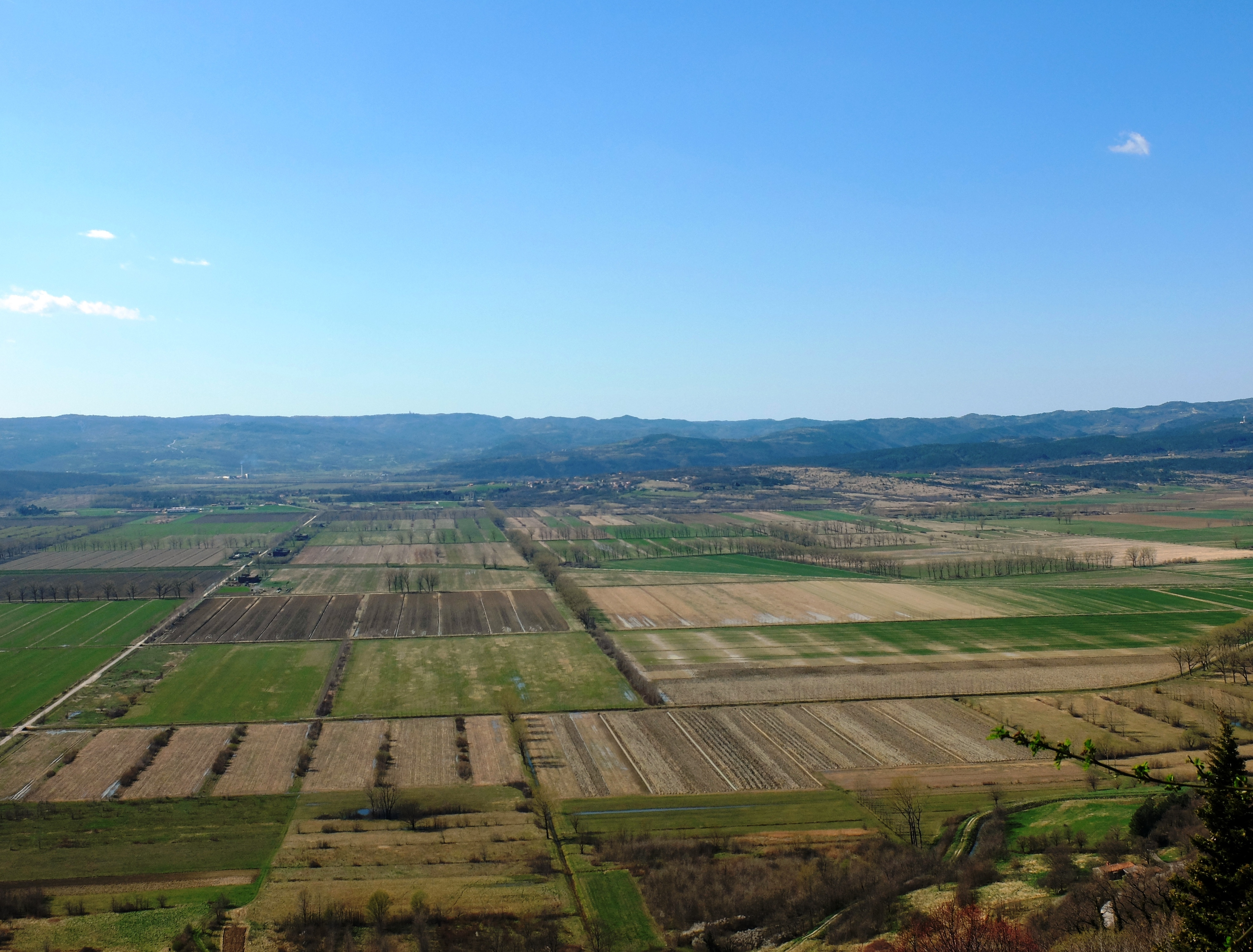
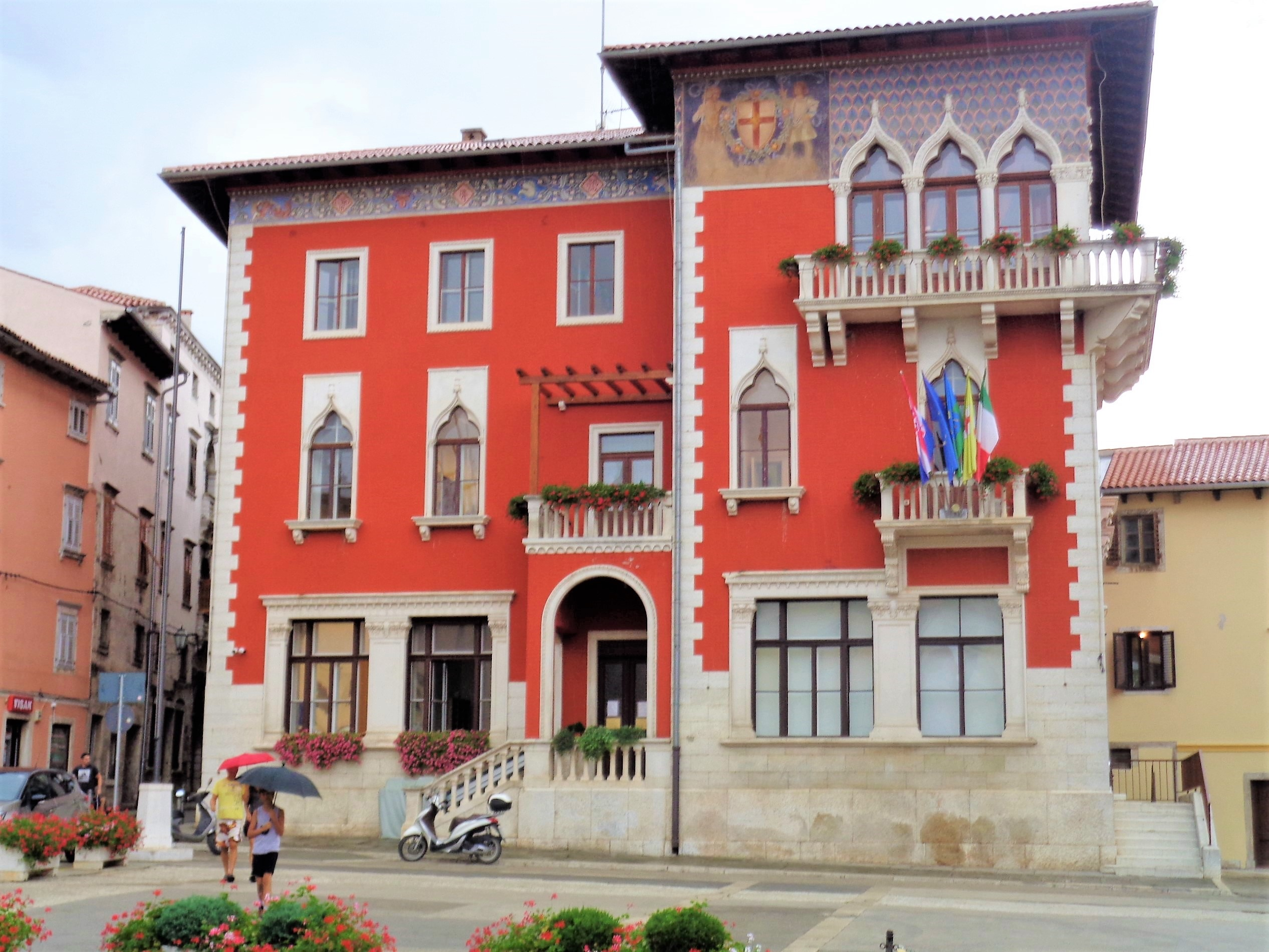
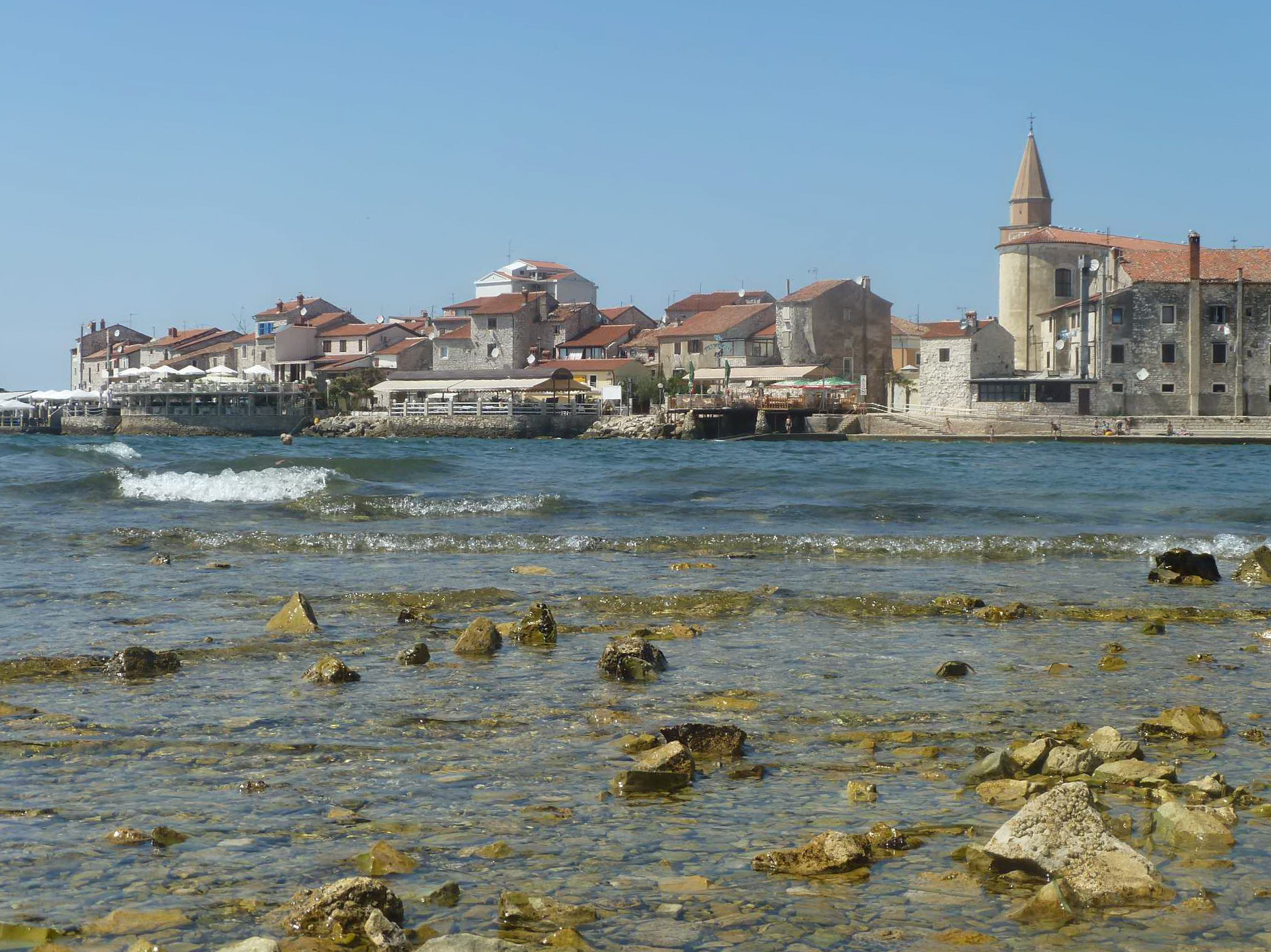

- Flag Coat of arms
- Anthem: Krasna zemljo (Croatian) "Beautiful land"
- Istria County within Croatia
- Country: Croatia
- County seat Largest city: Pazin; Pula

Government
  - Župan (Prefect): Boris Miletić (Ind.)
  - Assembly: 41 members: IDS, ISU, ZS (22); SDP (7); HDZ (5); Možemo!, ORaH (4); Independents (3)

Area
  - Total: 2,813 km^{2} (1,086 sq mi)

Population (2021)
  - Total: 195,794
  - Density: 69.60/km^{2} (180.3/sq mi)

Languages
  - Official languages: Croatian and Italian
- Area code: 052
- ISO 3166 code: HR-18
- HDI (2022): 0.896 very high · 3rd
- Website: www.istra-istria.hr

Istria County (/ˈɪstriə/; Croatian: Istarska županija; Italian: Regione istriana, lit. "Istrian Region") is the westernmost county of Croatia which includes the majority of the Istrian peninsula.

Administrative centers in the county are Pazin, Pula (Pola) and Poreč (Parenzo). Istria County has the largest Italian-speaking population in Croatia. It borders Slovenia on the north.

== History ==
The caves near Pula (in latinium Pietas Julia), Lim bay, Šandalja, and Roumald's cave, house Stone Age archaeological remains. Less ancient Stone Age sites, from the period between 6000 and 2000 BC can also be found in the area. More than 400 locations are classified as Bronze Age (1800–1000 BC) items. Numerous findings including weapons, tools, and jewelry) which are from the earlier iron era around the beginning of common era.

The Istrian peninsula was known to Romans as the terra magica. Its name is derived from the Histri, an Illyrian tribe who as accounted by the geographer Strabo lived in the region. Romans described them as pirates who were hard to conquer due to the difficulty of navigating the territory. After two military campaigns, Roman legions finally subdued them in 177 BC.

With the fall of the Western Roman Empire in 476, Istria was conquered by the Goths and then by the Byzantines. During Byzantine rule, it was shortly ruled by Avars. Istria was annexed by the Lombards in 751, by the Avars in 774, by the Franks during the reign of Charlemagne in 789, and successively controlled by various dukes, (Carinthia, Merano, Bavaria). Later it was run by the patriarchs of Aquileia.

In 1267 the Republic of Venice annexed the western and southern coast of the Istrian peninsula because of the strong presence of the autochthonous Italian community; during this period the region prospered. The major Istrian cities were reborn under Venetian government; it was in this half millennium that they developed architecturally and culturally. The eastern half of Istria was administered by the Habsburgs, and was referred to as "Imperial Istria" with its capital at Pisino (German: Mitterburg).

In 1797, with the Treaty of Campo Formio written by Napoleon, the peninsula with the whole Republic of Venice passed to the Habsburgs of Austria. The Treaty of Pressburg in 1805 handed Istria to the Kingdom of Italy. The Treaty of Schönbrunn in 1809 transferred Istria to France. In 1815, the Congress of Vienna confirmed Austria's possession on the Northern Adriatic Sea along with Istria. Regional guvernative units were formed in Gorizia (Gorizia county), Trieste (Istrian area), and Rijeka (Pazin county and Kvarner Gulf). From 1849 they were united in Austrian Littoral. The free port of Trieste presented an individual guvernative unit outside of other guvernative areas. Starting in 1861 until 1918/1920 the seat to a regional Parliament in the Austro-Hungarian Empire was in Parenzo (today: Poreč).

After World War I, according to the peace treaty of Rapallo Istria became part of Italy in 1920. Fascism and later Nazi occupation spoiled otherwise tolerant ethnic relations in the area. After World War II Istria was assigned to Yugoslavia and many ethnic Italians (Istrian Italians) left in the Istrian–Dalmatian exodus. With the collapse of Communist Yugoslavia Istria became part of an independent Croatia and the region saw no fighting in the ensuing war. Today it is one of the most economically developed parts of Croatia. Currently, some people ask for a higher degree of autonomy for the county. This is part of the Istrian regionalist movement.

Personalities like Robert Koch and writer James Joyce lived and worked in Istria. Writer Jules Verne was inspired to write his novel Mathias Sandorf after hearing of the quarry and cave in Pazin and the poet Dante Alighieri visited and wrote a few lines about Istria. Racing drivers Mario Andretti and Aldo Andretti were born in Montona in Istria.

== Geography ==
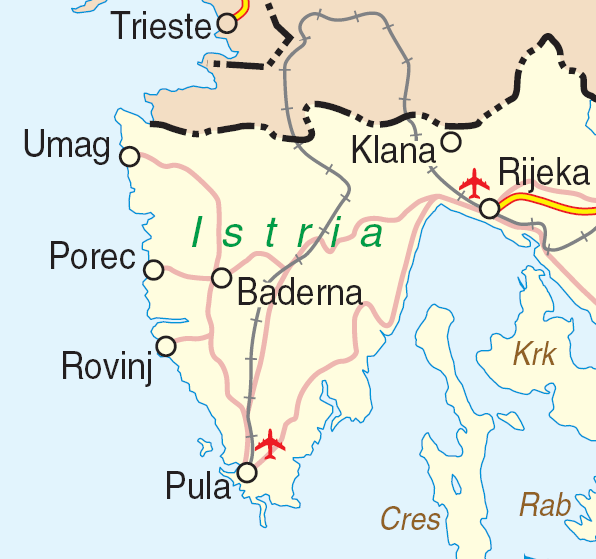
Map of Istria

Its coastline is 445 km (277 mi) long with islands making up 539.9 km (335 mi). A smaller part of Istria also belongs to the Primorje-Gorski Kotar County of Croatia. Mirroring the bay of Venice across the Adriatic and the Quarnaro Gulf, the region is not far from the Julian Alps. The westernmost point is at Savudrija while the southernmost is near Premantura, on the local promontory of Kamenjak.

The terrain consists of a limestone plateau much of which lacks water owing to its karst topography. The northeastern section is an extension of the Dinaric Alps. The highest point is Vojak on Učka mountain 1,401 m (4,596.46 ft) above sea level and there is another range of mountains, the Ćićarija.

There are so called "bijela", "siva", and "crvena" Istra (white, grey and red Istria). White Istria is around the mountain peaks, Grey Istria is the fertile inner lands while Red Istria is the blood-red painted lands of terra rossa or "crljenica" near the coastline.

Sites such as the Grotto of Baredine near Poreč, the underground river Pazinčica, and the karst Pazin pit (Pazinska jama) near Pazin are geologic attractions. The Limski Kanal is the only structure resembling a fjord in continental Europe outside of Scandinavia (though actually it is not a fjord, but a ria). The quarry near Rovinj has been designed for studying geology. The longest river, the Mirna is only 32 km (20 mi) long and its mouth is near Novigrad. Other rivers that pass through Istria include the Dragonja River and the Raša River.

The continental plains and valleys are primarily utilized for agriculture, such as growing cereals and vegetables. Closer to the sea, red lands are used for cultivation of grapes, vine, olives, and figs. Agriculture and the production of ecological food, the olive gardens, and the production of quality wines is the focus of Istria's agriculture sector. The coastline and nearby islands are rich in the maquis shrubland (mostly holm oak and strawberry tree). Woods, mostly oak and pine trees, cover a third of the territory.

The Brijuni national park and the Učka nature park are natural reservations and legally protected landscapes. This mountain range feeds the rivers and lakes from eastern Istria to the Raša river in the Labinština peninsula. Other localities are Lim Bay, the wood near Motovun, park woods Zlatni Rt and Šijana near Pula, the protected landscape of Kamenjak in the extreme south of Istria, and the reservation Palud with an ornithology near Rovinj. The Brijuni archipelago is a habitat of about 680 plant species, with diverse vegetation and olive groves.

== Climate ==
Protected from the north by the mountain chain of Alps as well the inner highland, the climate is borderline Mediterranean and humid subtropical with wetter winters and drier summers, but not completely dry. Overall a very pleasant climate with the highest air temperature averaging 24 °C during August, and the lowest air temperature averaging 5 °C in January. Summers are usually warm during the day and cooler near the evening, although strange heat wave patterns are common. The weather ranges from humid to dry with over 10 hours of sunshine daily. Primarily, there is a lot of moisture in the air especially in the coastal towns of Istra such as Poreč, Vrsar, Rovinj, Pula, and others. Temperatures above 10 °C last for more than 240 days a year. Excessive heat (above 30 °C) lasts for three weeks at the most. Despite air temperatures being lower than those in Dalmatia, the Adriatic Sea is warmer reaching up to 26 °C in August, coldest in March, (9-11 °C), while the freezing even in small, shallow bays is quite rare. There are two kinds of winds - the bora is bringing cold and clear weather from the north in winters, and the southern jugo bringing rain in summer. The maestral is a summer breeze blowing from the inland to the sea. The salinity of the sea water is 0.37%.

== Demographics ==
Historical populations of Istria County
Year	Pop.	±%
1857	117,719	—
1869	133,518	+13.4%
1880	160,000	+19.8%
1890	176,196	+10.1%
1900	194,455	+10.4%
1910	236,981	+21.9%
1921	215,167	−9.2%
1931	223,949	+4.1%
1948	183,344	−18.1%
1953	175,094	−4.5%
1961	176,838	+1.0%
1971	175,199	−0.9%
1981	188,332	+7.5%
1991	204,346	+8.5%
2001	206,344	+1.0%
2011	208,055	+0.8%
2021	195,794	−5.9%
Source: Naselja i stanovništvo Republike Hrvatske 1857–2001, Croatian Bureau of Statistics, Zagreb, 2005

According to the 2021 census the total population of Istria County is 195,794 which amounts to approximately 4.8% of Croatia's entire population. The county's population density is approximately 70 inhabitants per km^{2} with an average age of 45 years.

Istria County: Population trends 1857–2021
v

population	117719	133518	160000	176196	194455	236981	215167	223949	183344	175094	176838	175199	188332	204346	206344	208055	195794
	1857	1869	1880	1890	1900	1910	1921	1931	1948	1953	1961	1971	1981	1991	2001	2011	2021

Sources: Croatian Bureau of Statistics publications

Istria county is administratively subdivided into 41 local units of government - 10 of these are officially designated as cities/towns and 31 are largely rural municipalities. More than 70 percent of the county's population lives in these ten urban areas:

- Pula / Pola (57,460)
- Poreč / Parenzo (16,696)
- Rovinj / Rovigno (14,294)
- Umag / Umago (13,467)
- Labin / Albona (11,642)
- Pazin / Pisino (8,638)
- Buzet / Pinguente (6,133)
- Vodnjan / Dignano (6,119)
- Buje / Buie (5,182)
- Novigrad / Cittanova (4,345)

There are also 31 municipalities:

- Bale / Valle (1,127)
- Barban/ Barbana (2,721)
- Brtonigla / Verteneglio (1,626)
- Cerovlje / Cerreto (1,677)
- Fažana / Fasana (3,635)
- Gračišće / Gallignana (1,419)
- Grožnjan / Grisignana (736)
- Kanfanar / Canfanaro (1,543)
- Karojba / Caroiba (1,438)
- Kaštelir-Labinci / Castellier-Santa Domenica (1,463)
- Kršan / Chersano (2,951)
- Lanišće / Lanischie (329)
- Ližnjan / Lisignano (3,965)
- Lupoglav / Lupogliano (924)
- Marčana / Marzana (4,253)
- Medulin / Medolino (6,481)
- Motovun / Montona (1,004)
- Oprtalj / Portole (850)
- Pićan / Pedena (1,827)
- Raša / Arsia (3,183)
- Sveta Nedelja / Santa Domenica d'Albona (2,987)
- Sveti Lovreč / San Lorenzo di Pasenatico (1,015)
- Sveti Petar u Šumi / San Pietro di Selve (1,065)
- Svetvinčenat / Sanvincenti (2,202)
- Tar-Vabriga / Torre-Abrega (1,990)
- Tinjan / Antignana (1,684)
- Višnjan / Visignano (2,274)
- Vižinada / Visinada (1,158)
- Vrsar / Orsera (2,162)
- Žminj / Gimino (3,483)
- Funtana / Fontane (907)
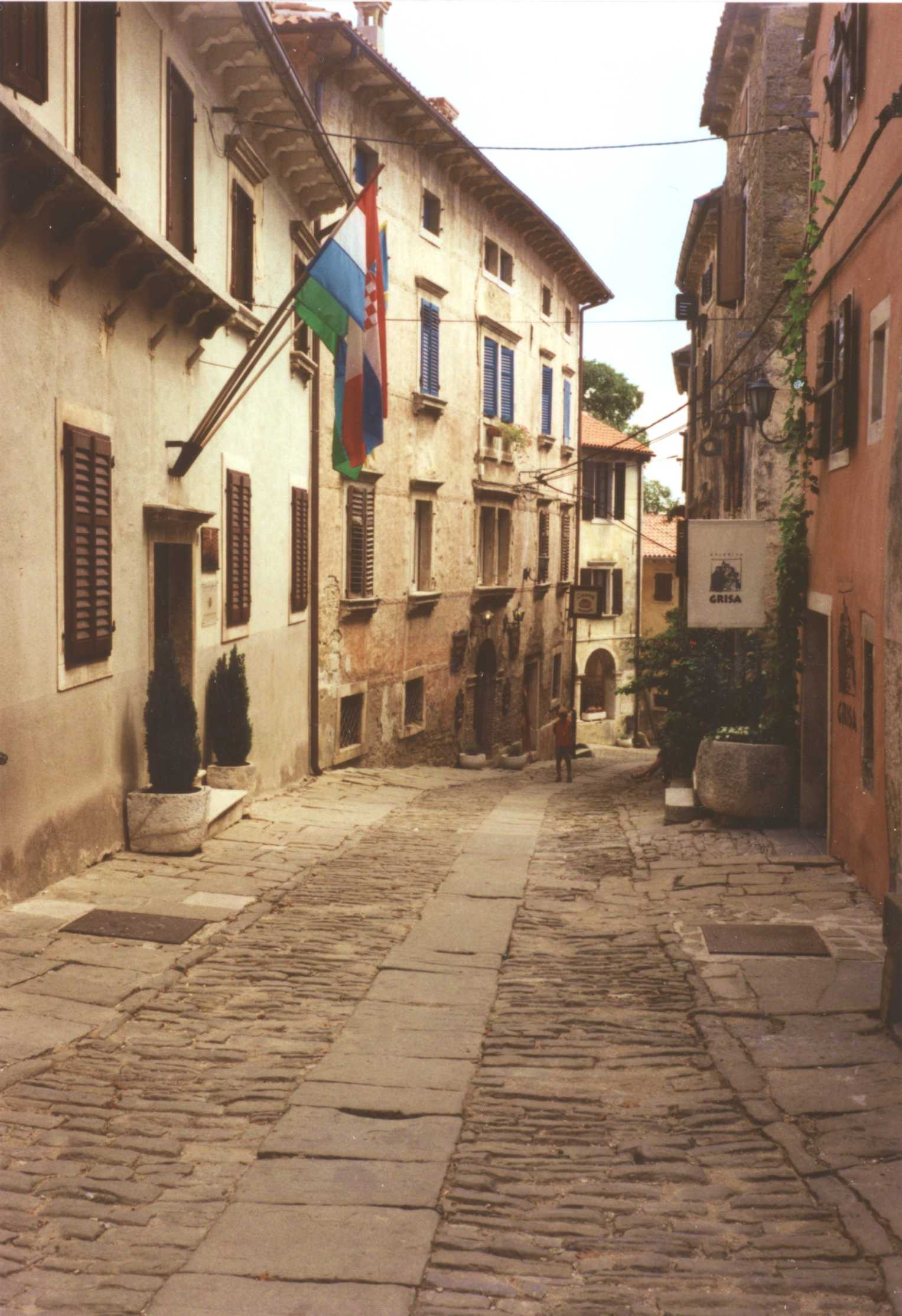
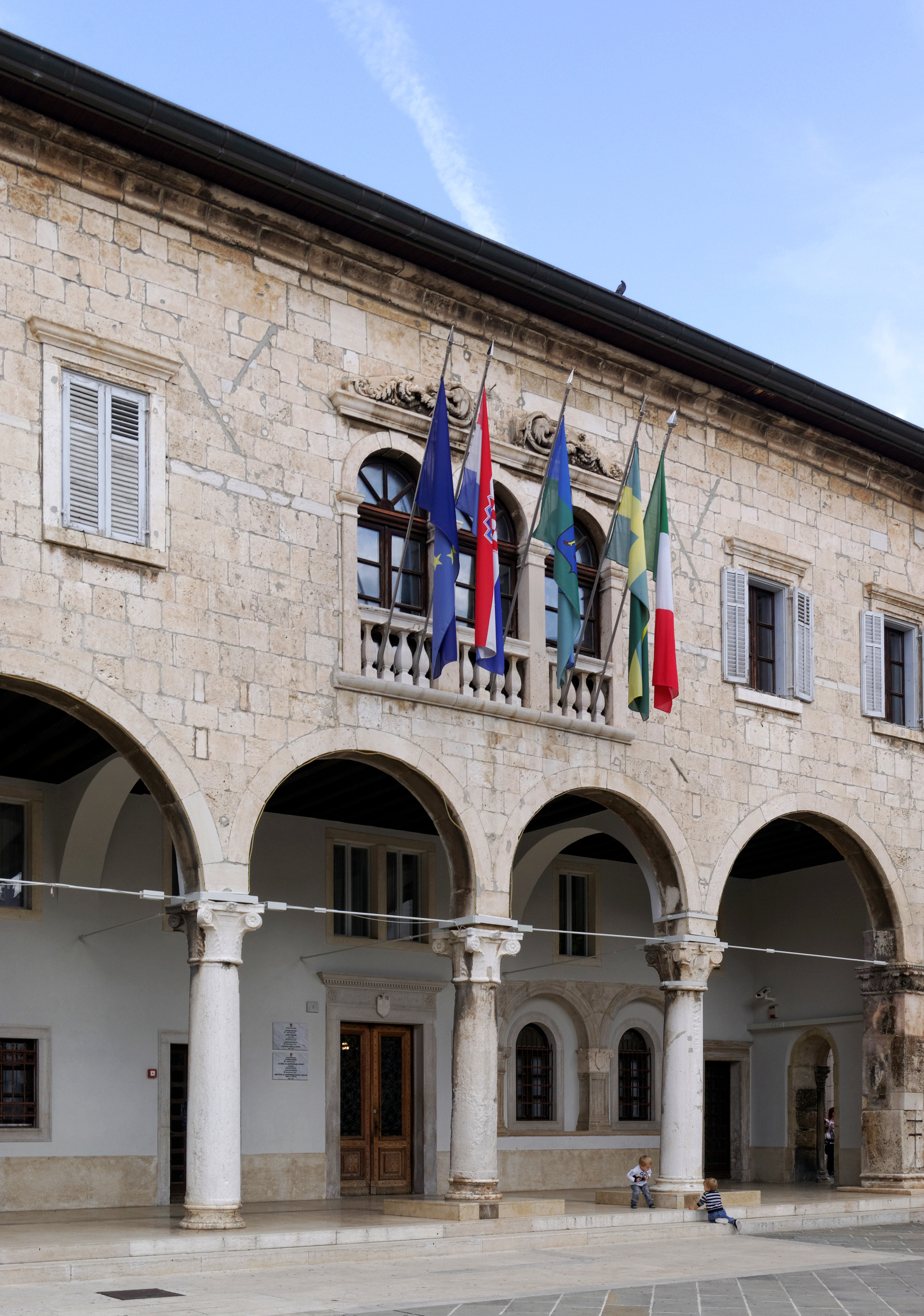
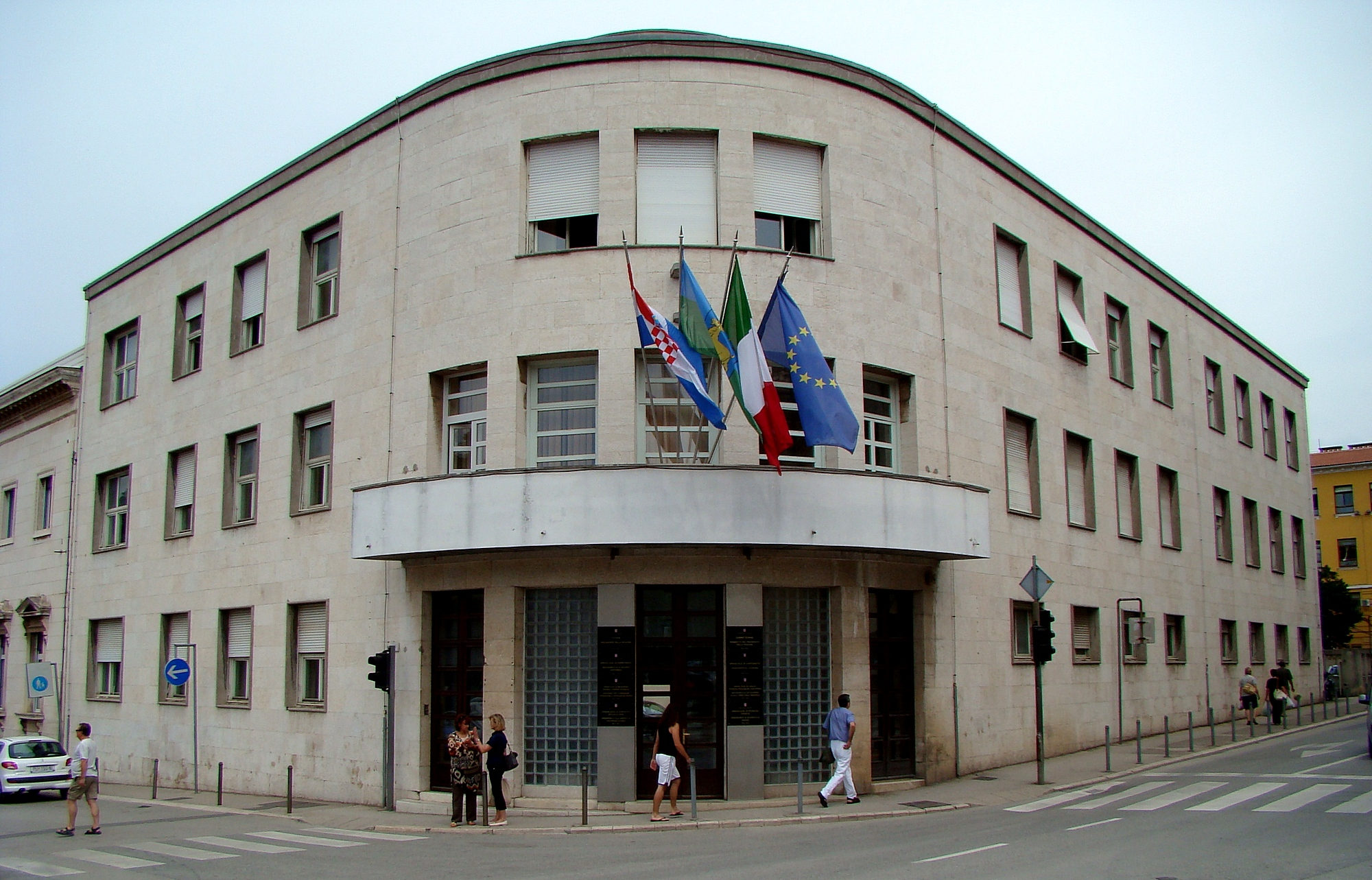
The Italian tricolour as flag of the autochthonous Italian minority is displayed alongside the Croatian and the Istrian flags on government buildings

Italian is recognized in the county as an official language, alongside the official Croatian, and the Chakavian dialect of Croatian is often in use, as in most coastal counties.

In 2021 the population was 195,237 and the main ethnic groups were as follows:

- Croats – 149,152 (76.40%)
- Regional affiliation – 10,025 (5.13%)
- Italians – 9,784 (5.01%)
- Serbs – 5,778 (2.98%)
- Bosniaks – 4,838 (2.48%)
- Albanians – 2,055 (1.05%)

Before World War I and until World War II, Istria contained a large autochthonous Romance-language-speaking community consisting of Venetian dialects, Istriot and Istro-Romanian along with Italian, plus various local Slavic dialects, some of which were likewise unique to Istria. Today, apart from the local dialects and official Croatian, one still finds in this region a small community of people, the Istro-Romanians, who speak Istro-Romanian, closely related to Romanian, other districts where Venetian dialects and Istriot are still spoken.

Due to its traditional bond with Europe and its level of international integration, in 1994 Istria County was the first Croatian region to become a member of the Assembly of European Regions.

== Transport ==
Istria is well connected with the rest of Croatia and Europe. Due to its connection with a wider European area, road development suitably covers all needs and contributes to a balanced development of the coastal area and the Istrian interior.

Initially, the need for railroads in Istria was based upon fast development of industrial activities; shipbuilding, construction material, machine and electric industries, as well as Austrian military interests. After Vienna and Trieste were connected in 1876, the railway between Divača, (in today's Slovenia) and Pula, (122 km (76 mi) long with 21 km (13 mi) long branch Kanfanar - Rovinj), was opened. Despite numerous initiatives, the western parts of Istria have been connected with the railroad only in 1902, with construction of the Parenzana narrow-gauge railway. The 123.1 km (76 mi) long railway, was dismantled in 1935. To this day, Istria County's rail connections are only towards Slovenia, and despite the fact that some plans to build railroad tunnel through Učka mountain date from decades ago, there are no projections about financing and works are not scheduled to start any time soon. The connection to the rest of Croatian rail network is by HŽ national railways' bus service from the Lupoglav junction to the Rijeka Station via Učka road tunnel

Croatian Istria County's highway system is callen the "Istrian Y". A8 motorway connects the county to the rest of Croatia from Matulji (A7/ further A6) interchange through Učka Tunnel to Kanfanar interchange, and A9 motorway connects Pula via Kanfanar to Umag, connecting the county to Slovenian Istria and further to Italy.

The only significant airport with scheduled commercial service is Pula Airport. Large majority of flights are only seasonal.

== Economy ==
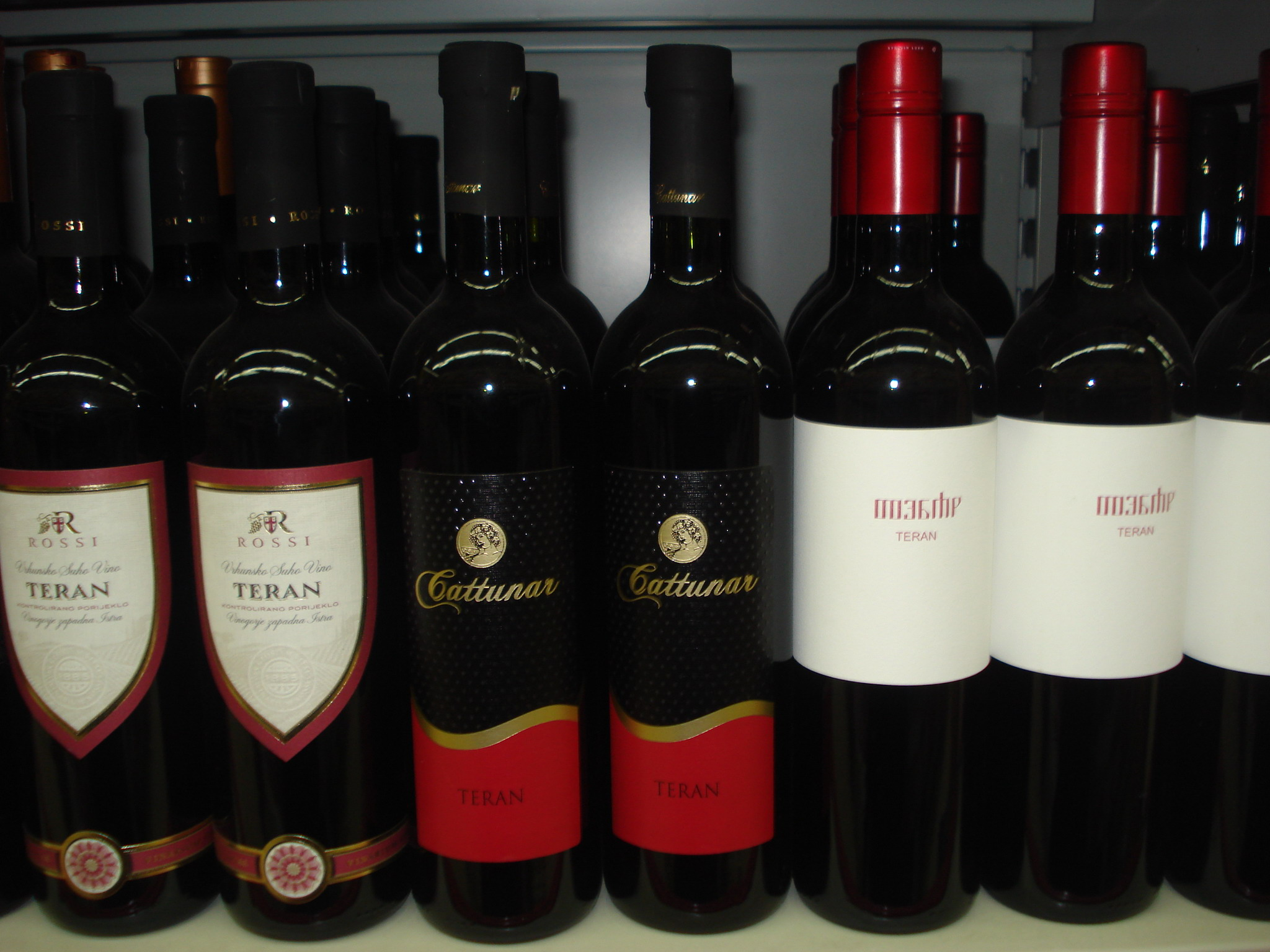
Various bottles of Teran, red wine with controlled geographical origin, produced in specified region of Western Istria

Well-developed are processing industry, with traditional agriculture, sea fishing and growing, construction and production of construction materials (lime, cement, brick, stone), trade and transport. Most developed branches of industry are shipbuilding (In the early 1970s its Uljanik shipyard was building the biggest ships in the world as Berge Adria and others), metal processing, wood industry, furniture industry, automotive components industry, electric machines and appliances industry, glass, plastic, textile, tobacco industry. According to economic indicators, the leading activities are processing industry, tourism, and trade.

Great attention is being given to agriculture and the production of ecologic food, the wine and olive growing. Historically cultivated local wine varieties include Malvasia (white) and Teran (red).

Istrian olive growers are being included in the first international extra virgin olive oil guide Flos Olei since 2000s, with Istria being both second and then first in the world by number of the included olive growers for 8 years respectively. Istria was declared world's best olive oil region by this guide for 8 years in a row (2017-2024).

== Tourism ==
Organized tourism in Istria goes back to the Romans, when emperor Vespasian, for the entertainment of that time, built the Pula Arena. During the reign of Austro-Hungarian Empire in (1866), Austrian and Hungarian royalty and aristocracy started visiting local resorts and discovered Poreč.

Significant efforts were made after World War II to develop the tourist infrastructure and to accentuate its importance. In combination with the natural environment, history and cultural heritage, investments resulted in developed and competitive service all along the western coast in Poreč, Pula, Rovinj, Umag, Novigrad, and Vrsar.

One growing trend among the centrally located cities, especially Kanfanar, is agritourism. Beginning with La Casa di Matiki in 1994 after the war, a number of eccentric agritouristic Bed and Breakfasts have sprung up in central Istria, providing opportunities for individuals, couples, and families to experience a very authentic Istrian experience while learning about the Istrian agricultural lifestyle.

In the eastern part, as part of another county, there are resorts like Rabac, Opatija. Istria was and still is the most important tourist destination in Croatia, hosting the western and central European visitors, mostly from Germany, Slovenia, Austria and Italy. Area is the most visited tourist region with 27% of all visitors and 35% of time spent in all of Croatia.

== County government ==
Distribution of seats in the Assembly of the Istrian County, 2021

The current Prefect of Istria County is Boris Miletić (Ind.). County day is celebrated on 25 September.

The county assembly is composed of 41 representatives from the following political parties:

Political party	Seats won	Government
IDS (DDI)- ISU - ZS	23 / 41	Government
SDP	7 / 41	Opposition
HDZ	6 / 41	Opposition
We Can! - ORaH	5 / 41	Opposition

=== Minority councils and representatives ===
Directly elected minority councils and representatives are tasked with consulting tasks for the local or regional authorities in which they are advocating for minority rights and interests, integration into public life and participation in the management of local affairs. At the 2023 Croatian national minorities councils and representatives elections Albanians, Bosniaks, Montenegrins (electing 22 members), Roma, Slovenes (electing 24 members), Serbs and Italians of Croatia each fulfilled legal requirements to elect 25 members minority councils of the Istria County while Czechs, Hungarians, Macedonians and Ukrainians of Croatia elected individual representatives with German, Russian and Slovak representatives remained unelected due to the lack of candidates. Numerous municipalities, towns or cities in the county elected their own local minority councils as well.

Although though the Government of the Republic of Croatia does not guarantee official Croatian-Italian bilinguialism, the statute of Istria County itself guarantees it. According to the Statute, "In the Istrian Region, the Croatian and the Italian language are in equal official use in the work of the Regional committees in the self-governing domain". Preserving traditional Italian place names and assigning street names to Italian historical figures is legally mandated and carried out.

== See also ==
- Castellieri culture
- Counties of Croatia
- History of Istria
- Istria
- Roman Catholic Diocese of Poreč and Pula
