= Engelbert II =

Engelbert II may refer to:

- Engelbert II of Istria (died 1141)
- Engelbert II, Count of Gorizia (died 1191)
- Engelbert II of Berg (1185 or 1186 – 1225)
- Engelbert II of Falkenburg (1220–1274), Archbishop of Cologne
- Engelbert II of the Mark (died 1328)
- Engelbert II of Nassau (1451–1504)
