= Engelbert II of Gorizia =

Italian count in Holy Roman Empire (d. 1191)

Engelbert II
- Count of Gorizia
- Coat of arms of the Counts of Gorizia, Ingeram Codex, 1459
- Died: 1 April 1191
- Noble family: House of Gorizia (Meinhardiner)
- Spouse: Adelaide of Scheyern-Dachau-Valley
- Issue: Engelbert III, Count of Gorizia; Meinhard II, Count of Gorizia
- Father: Meinhard I, Count of Gorizia
- Mother: Elisabeth of Schwarzenburg

Engelbert II (died 1 April 1191), a member of the House of Gorizia (Meinhardiner dynasty), was Count of Gorizia (Görz) from 1150 until his death. At the end of his life, he also held the title of a Margrave of Istria, a Count palatine in the Duchy of Carinthia and Vogt (Reeve) of the Patriarchate of Aquileia.

== Life ==
Engelbert II was a younger son of Count Meinhard I of Gorizia and his wife Elisabeth of Schwarzenburg. He was first mentioned in 1137 as Vogt of Millstatt Abbey, an office his uncle Engelbert I (d. 1122) probably had assumed upon the death of the Aribonid founders. About 1145, Engelbert II was appointed Count Palatine of Carinthia.

In 1150, he inherited the County of Gorizia from his elder brother Henry II. Like his father, he was also served as Reeve of Aquileia and St Peter Abbey in Istria. A strong supporter of the Hohenstaufen dynasty, Engelbert II, like his younger brother Meinhard, had temporarily been Margrave of Istria. Rivalling with the Dukes of Merania from the comital House of Andechs, his descendants would gain further territory in inner Istria around Pazin (Mitterburg).

== Marriage and issue ==
He was married to Adelaide, a daughter of Count Otto I of Scheyern-Dachau-Valley. They had three children:

- Engelbert III (d. 1220), Count of Gorizia and Vogt of Millstatt
- Meinhard II "the Elder" (c. 1160–1232), Count of Gorizia and provost of Aquileia
- Beatrice of Gorizia, nun in Aquileia

Engelbert II of Gorizia Meinhardiner Died: 1 April 1191
Preceded by Henry II	Count of Gorizia; 1150–1191	Succeeded by Engelbert III
