= Meinhard II of Gorizia =

Meinhard II
- Count of Gorizia
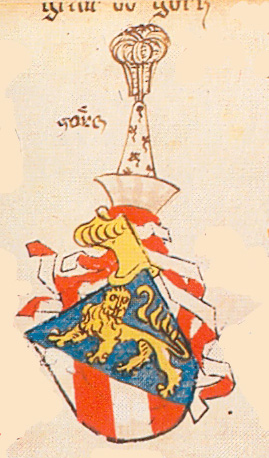
- Coat of arms of the Albertine line of the Counts of Gorizia, Ingeram Codex, 1459
- Born: c. 1160
- Died: 1231
- Noble family: House of Gorizia
- Father: Engelbert II, Count of Gorizia
- Mother: Adelaide of Scheyen-Dachau-Valley

Meinhard II, nicknamed the Elder (c. 1160 – 1231), a member of the House of Gorizia (Meinhardiner), was ruling Count of Gorizia from 1220 until his death. He also held the title of Vogt (Reeve) of the Patriarchate of Aquileia.

== Life ==
He was the younger son of Count Engelbert II of Gorizia (d. 1191) and his wife Adelaide, a daughter of the Bavarian count Otto I of Scheyern-Dachau-Valley, a progenitor of the ducal House of Wittelsbach.

Meinhard is known to have taken part in the German Crusade of 1197 launched by the Hohenstaufen emperor Henry VI. He laid witness to the death of his friend, the Babenberg duke Frederick I of Austria with Bishop Wolfger of Passau, Count Eberhard of Dörnberg, Count Ulrich III of Eppan and Frederick's closest attendant on 16 April 1198 at Acre.

In 1220, Meinhard II succeeded his elder brother Engelbert III as Count of Gorizia. He died in 1231 and was succeeded by his nephew Meinhard III, who in 1253 also inherited the County of Tyrol.

== Marriage and issue ==
Count Meinhard II married three times:

1. Kunigunde, a daughter of Count Conrad I of Peilstein, a member of the Siegharding dynasty, from whom the Meinhardiner claimed to descend, in 1183
2. Adelaide, about whom little is known
3. a daughter of Count Henry I of Tyrol.

From these marriages he had several children, but none of them survived childhood.

== Bibliography ==
- Baum, Wilhelm (2000). Die Grafen von Görz in der europäischen Politik des Mittelalters. Kitab. ISBN 978-3902005045.
- Juritsch, Georg (1894). Geschichte der Babenberger und ihrer Länder, 976-1246. Innsbruck: Wagnerschen Universitätsbuchhandlung.
- Pizzinini, Meinrad (2015). Die Grafen von Görz. Haymon Verlag. ISBN 978-3852187013.

Meinhard II of Gorizia House of Gorizia Born: c. 1160 Died: 1231
Preceded by Engelbert III	Count of Gorizia; 1220–1231	Succeeded by Meinhard III
