= Engelbert III of Gorizia =

Engelbert III, Count of Gorizia
- Coat of arms of the Albertine line of the Meinhardiner dynasty, the Counts of Gorizia, in the Ingeram Codex, 1459
- Died: 1220
- Noble family: Meinhardiner
- Spouses: Matilda; Matilda of Andechs
- Issue: Meinhard I
- Father: Engelbert II, Count of Gorizia
- Mother: Adelaide of Scheyen-Dachau-Valley

Engelbert III, Count of Gorizia (died 1220) was a member of the Meinhardiner dynasty. He ruled the County of Gorizia from 1191 until his death.

Engelbert's father was Engelbert II, Count Palatine of Carinthia and Count of Gorizia. His mother was Adelaide, the daughter of Count Otto I of Wittelsbach. In 1191, Engelbert III inherited the County of Gorizia jointly with his brother Meinhard II. During his reign, Engelbert acquired the title of Vogt of Aquileia. He also acted as bailiff of Millstatt.

In 1183, he married a noble lady named Matilda, Countess of Pisino. In 1190, he remarried, to Matilda of Andechs, the daughter of Margrave Berthold I of Istria. The latter Matilda was the mother of his successor Meinhard III.

== Sources ==
- Lyon, Jonathan R. (2013). Princely Brothers and Sisters: The Sibling Bond in German Politics, 1100–1250. Cornell University Press.

Engelbert III of Gorizia Meinhardiner Died: 1220
Preceded by Engelbert II	Count of Gorizia; 1191–1220; With: Meinhard II	Succeeded by Meinhard III
