= Berthold I of Istria =

Margrave of Istria (1110–1188)

Berthold I
- Margrave of Istria
- Coat-of-arms of Andechs
- Born: c. 1110/1122
- Died: 14 December 1188
- Buried: Dießen Abbey
- Noble family: House of Andechs
- Spouses: Hedwig of Wittelsbach; Luitgard of Denmark
- Issue: Berthold, Duke of Merania; Matilda of Andechs
- Father: Berthold II, Count of Andechs
- Mother: Sophie of Istria

Berthold III (c. 1110/1122 – 14 December 1188), a member of the Bavarian House of Andechs, was Margrave of Istria (as Berthold I) from 1173 until his death.

He was the son of Count Berthold II of Andechs, ruler over Dießen in Bavaria, Plassenburg in Franconia and Stein in Carniola, and his first wife Sophia, a daughter of Margrave Poppo II of Istria. His brother Otto became Prince-Bishop of Brixen in 1165. A loyal supporter of the Hohenstaufen emperor Frederick Barbarossa, Count Berthold rose to one of the most important nobles, holding extended estates in Bavaria as well as in Franconia and in Carniola south of the Eastern Alps.

In 1173, he was appointed Margrave of Istria, succeeding Engelbert III, the last Margrave from the House of Sponheim and cousin of his mother Sophia. When in 1180 Emperor Frederick deposed the Welf duke Henry the Lion, he vested Berthold's son, Count Berthold IV, with the title of a Duke of Merania, thereby elevating the House of Andechs to princely status.

== Marriage and issue ==
Berthold III was married twice. In 1152 he married Hedwig of Wittelsbach, daughter of the Bavarian Count palatine Otto IV of Scheyern and Heilika of Pettendorf-Lengenfeld-Hopfenohe. They had:

1. Berthold IV, Duke of Merania (1153–1204)
2. Sophia (died 1218). Married Poppo VI, Count of Henneberg (died c. 1190)
3. Kunigunde (died after 1207), married Eberhard, Count of Eberstein
4. Matilda, Countess of Pisino (died 1245), married Berthold, Margrave of Vohburg. In c. 1190 married secondly Engelbert III, Count of Gorizia (died 1217/1220).
5. unidentified daughter, married Ampud II, ispán of Szolnok County (fl. 1199)

His second wife was Luitgard of Denmark, daughter of king Sweyn III of Denmark and Adela of Meissen. They had:

1. Poppo, Bishop of Bamberg (died December 2, 1245)
2. Berta, Abbess in Gerbstadt (died 1190)

== Sources ==
- Arnold, Benjamin (2003). Princes and Territories in Medieval Germany. Cambridge University Press. ISBN 9780521521482.
- Lyon, Jonathan R. (2013). Princely Brothers and Sisters: The Sibling Bond in German Politics, 1100–1250. Cornell University Press.
- Newman, Martha G. (2020). Cistercian Stories for Nuns and Monks. University of Pennsylvania Press.
- Wertner, Mór (1895). "Ompud nádor és utódai [Palatine Ampud and his Descendants]". Turul (in Hungarian). 13 (2): 91–93. ISSN 1216-7258.

Berthold I of Istria House of Andechs Born: c. 1110/1122 Died: 4 December 1188
Preceded by Engelbert III	Margrave of Istria; 1173–1188	Succeeded by Berthold II
