= Matilda of Andechs =

German nobility (died 1245)

- Coat-of-arms of Andechs
- Died: 1245
- Noble family: House of Andechs
- Spouse: Engelbert III
- Issue: Meinhard
- Father: Berthold I of Istria
- Mother: Hedwig of Dachau-Wittelsbach

Matilda of Andechs (died 1245) was a daughter of Margrave Berthold I of Istria and his first wife, Hedwig of Dachau-Wittelsbach, daughter of the Bavarian Count palatine Otto IV of Scheyern.

Matilda married Count Engelbert III of Gorizia (d. 1220). They had one son: Meinhard, who would inherit the title of Duke of Merania after the death of the childless Duke Otto II. However, by then this title was meaningless, as the Istrian and Carniolan marches had passed to the Patriarchate of Aquileia, and the original Andechs estates had been seized by the Bavarian dukes.

== Sources ==
- Lyon, Jonathan R. (2013). Princely Brothers and Sisters: The Sibling Bond in German Politics, 1100–1250. Cornell University Press.
