= Pazinčica =

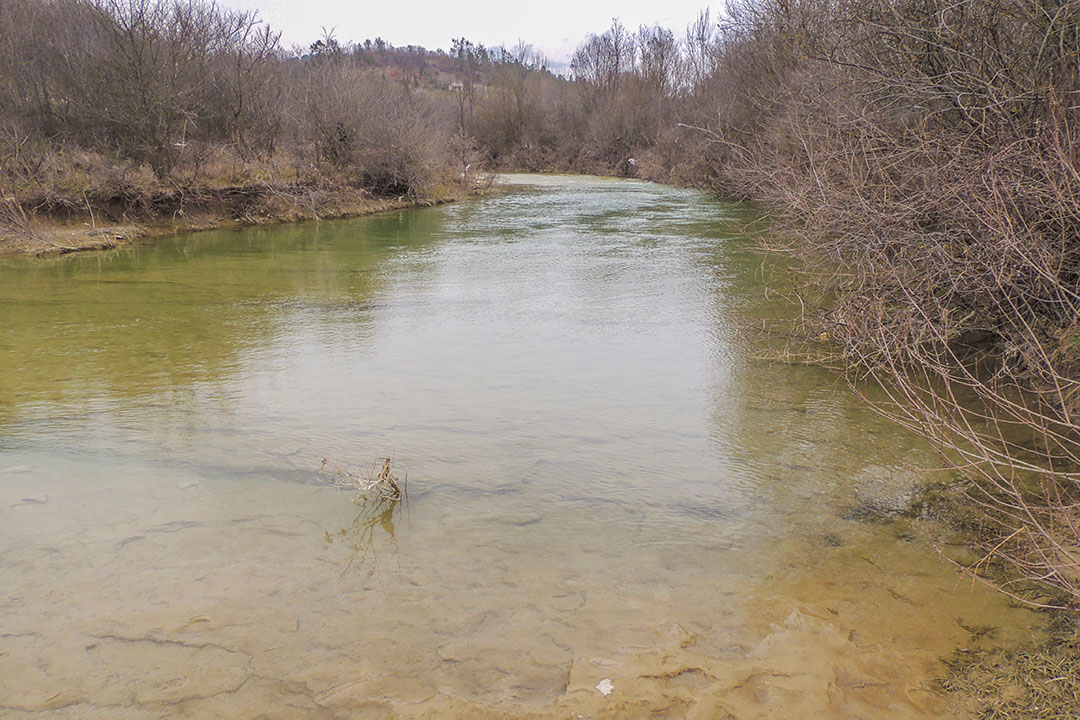
- Upper course.

Location
- Countries: Croatia

Physical characteristics
- Source
  - location: Borut
  - elevation: 320 m (1,050 ft)
- Mouth
  - location: Pazin
  - coordinates: 45.239594°N 13.930184°E
- Length: 18 km (11 mi)
- Basin size: 77 km^{2} (30 sq mi)

The Pazinčica or Pazinski potok (Italian: Foiba, Fojba), locally Potȍk or Patȍk, is a river in the central part of the Istrian peninsula, west Croatia. It flows 18 kilometres (11 mi) above ground before entering its ponor, the Pazinska jama, continuing as a subterranean river. It is the longest such river in Istria.

== Course ==
From its source near Borut to its ponor in Pazin, it has only a few constant tributaries: the Brestovica, Toplica, Lipa, Rakov potok and Frnežar.

From its spring to its ponor, the elevation difference is a mere 35 metres (115 ft) to 50 metres (160 ft), supported by layers of flysch. Its final section is relatively complex, featuring stone blocks called kruge, lakes called puče and two larger waterfalls (Zarečki krov and Pazinski krov).

In its geological history, it once drained directly into the Adriatic through what is now the Lim valley. The course of the river was then diverted from a northward to a southward direction where, at the contact between flysch and limestone, a ponor was formed. Flow tracing has shown that the river drains partly into several springs in the valley of the Raša river, and partly into springs towards the south of the peninsula. The springs in the Raša valley in question are Sveti Anton, Rakonek, Grdak and Sušaki.

== Hydrology ==
Its maximum water level is 255 centimetres (100 in).

The record high discharge of 97.84 cubic metres (3,455 cu ft) was reached in 1964.

== History ==
In 1935, 1961 and 1964, a 2 kilometres (1.2 mi) to 3 kilometres (1.9 mi) lake formed at the mouth of the ponor.

In 1993, a footbridge was built across the river near the ponor, known as Vršić or Most preko Jame.

== Gallery ==
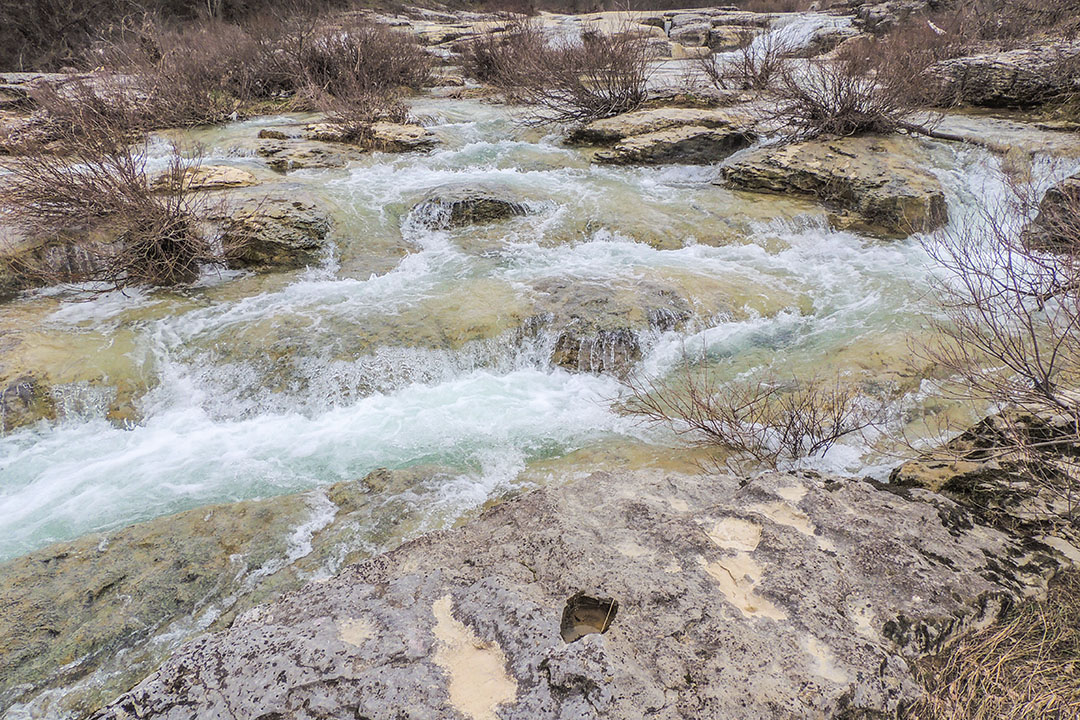
Lower course.

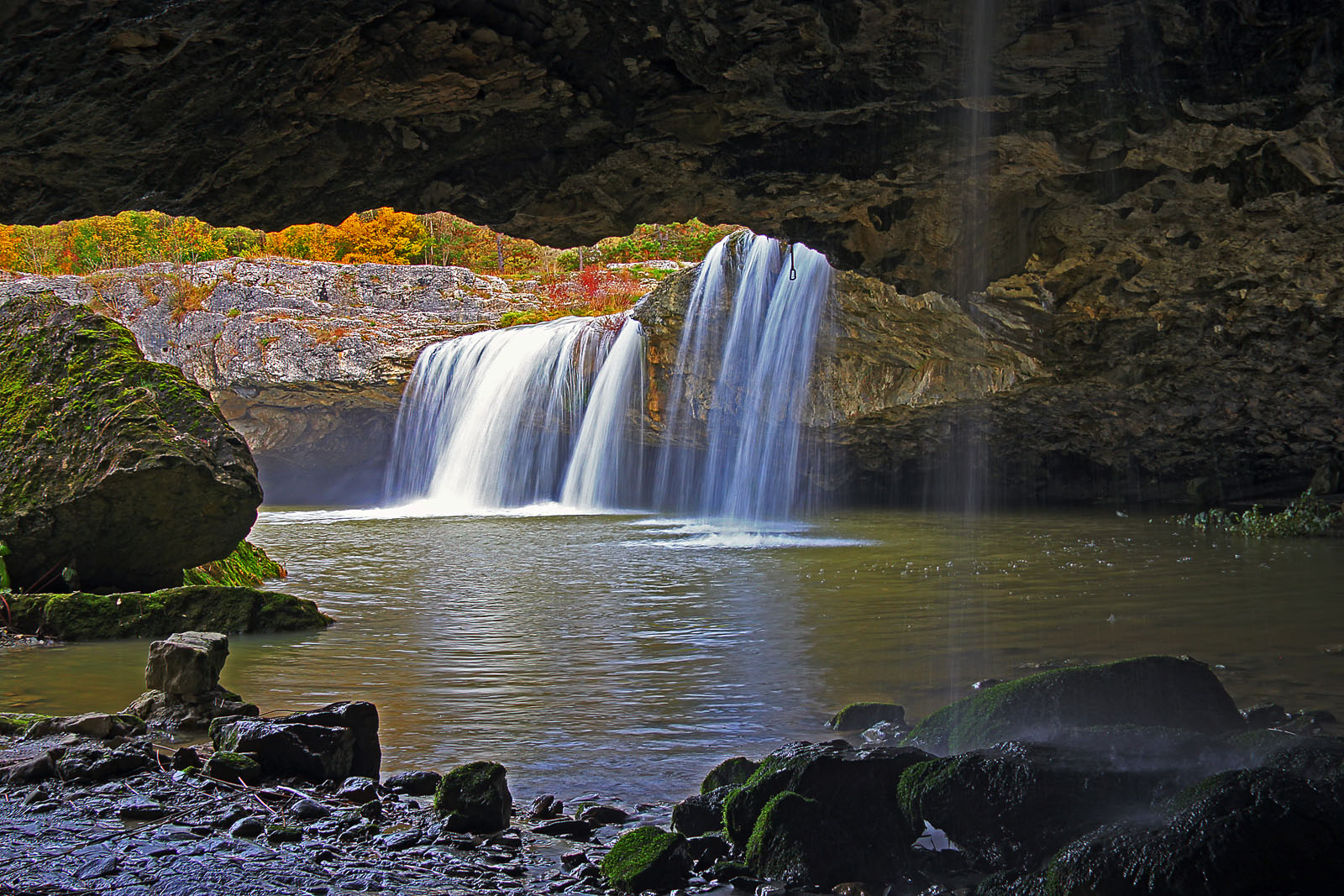
Zarečki krov.

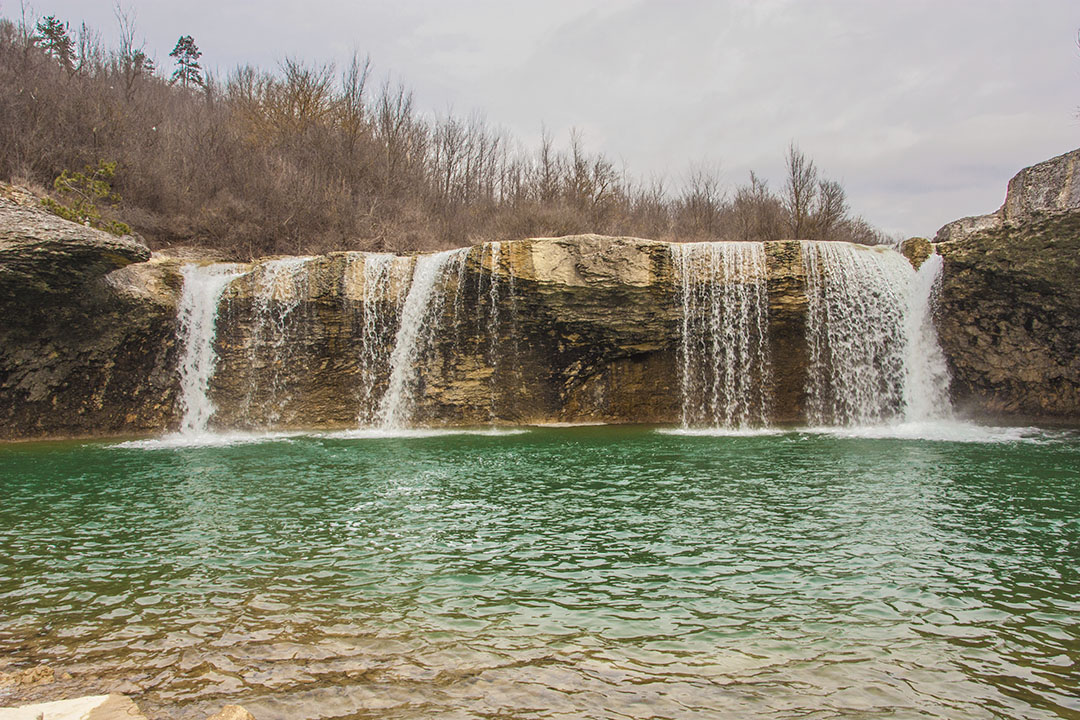
Pazinski krov.

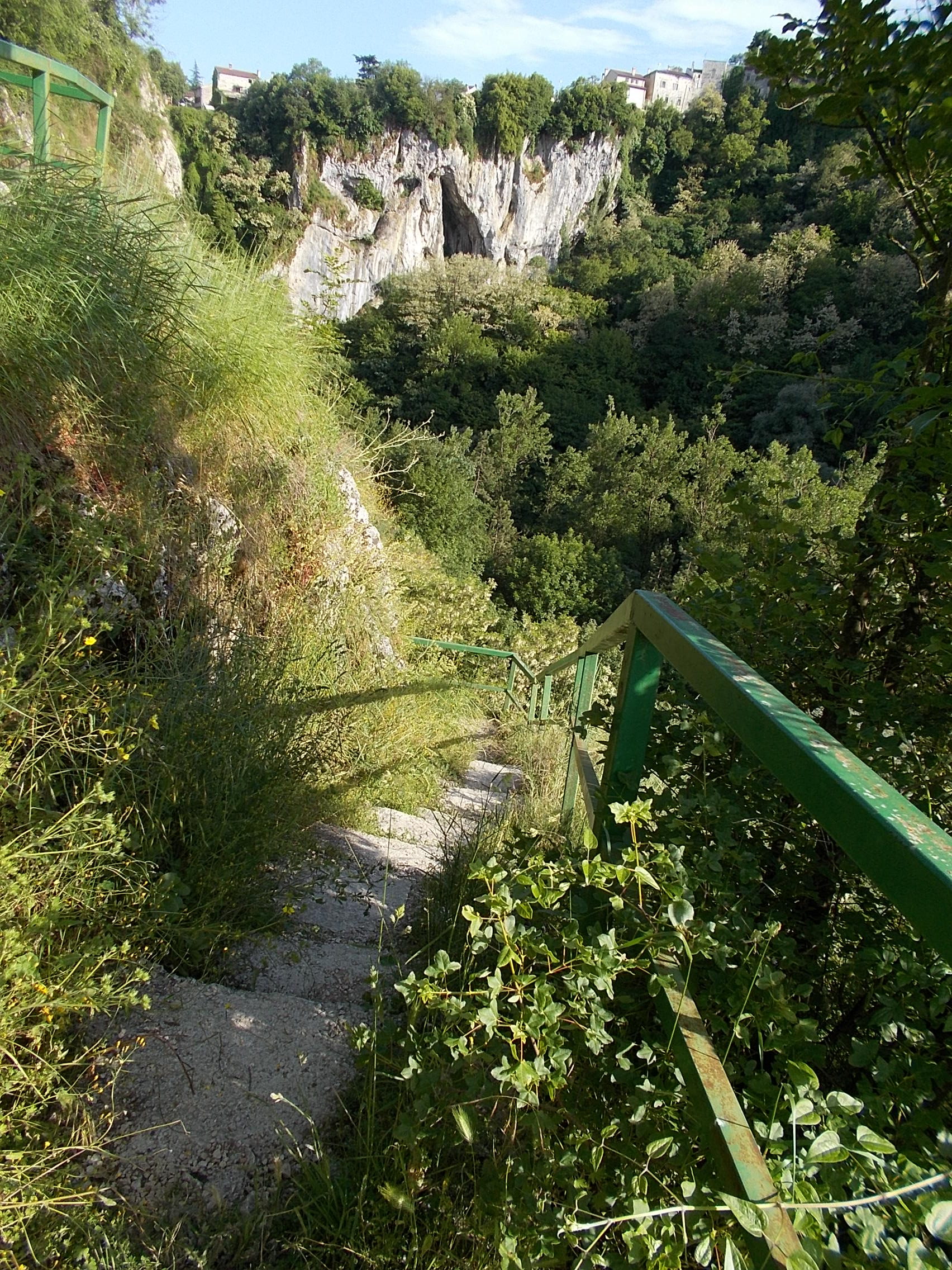
Pazin Canyon

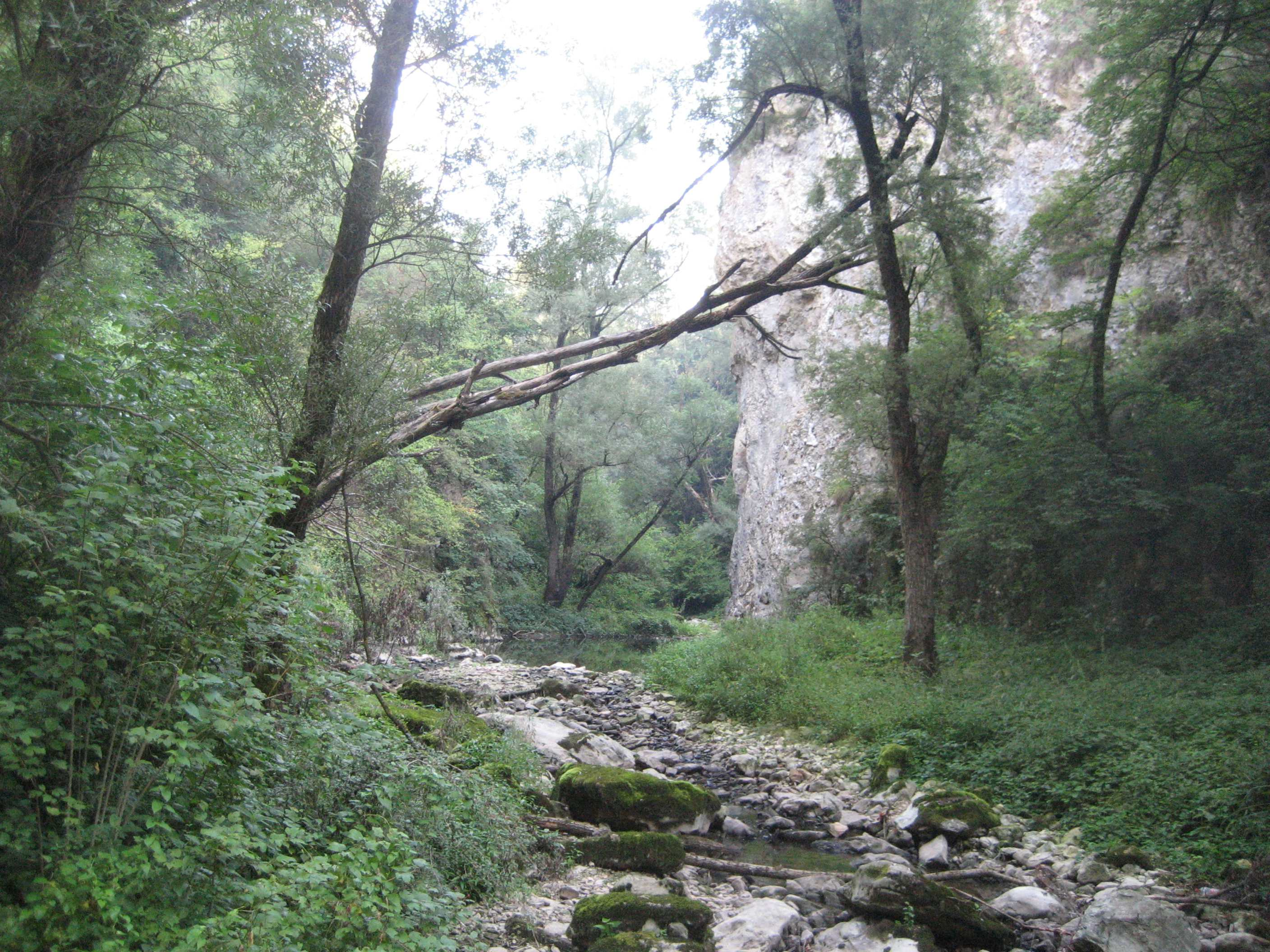
Near its ponor.
