= Sveti Petar u Šumi =

Sveti Petar u Šumi San Pietro in Selve
- Municipality
- Sveti Petar u Šumi Municipality
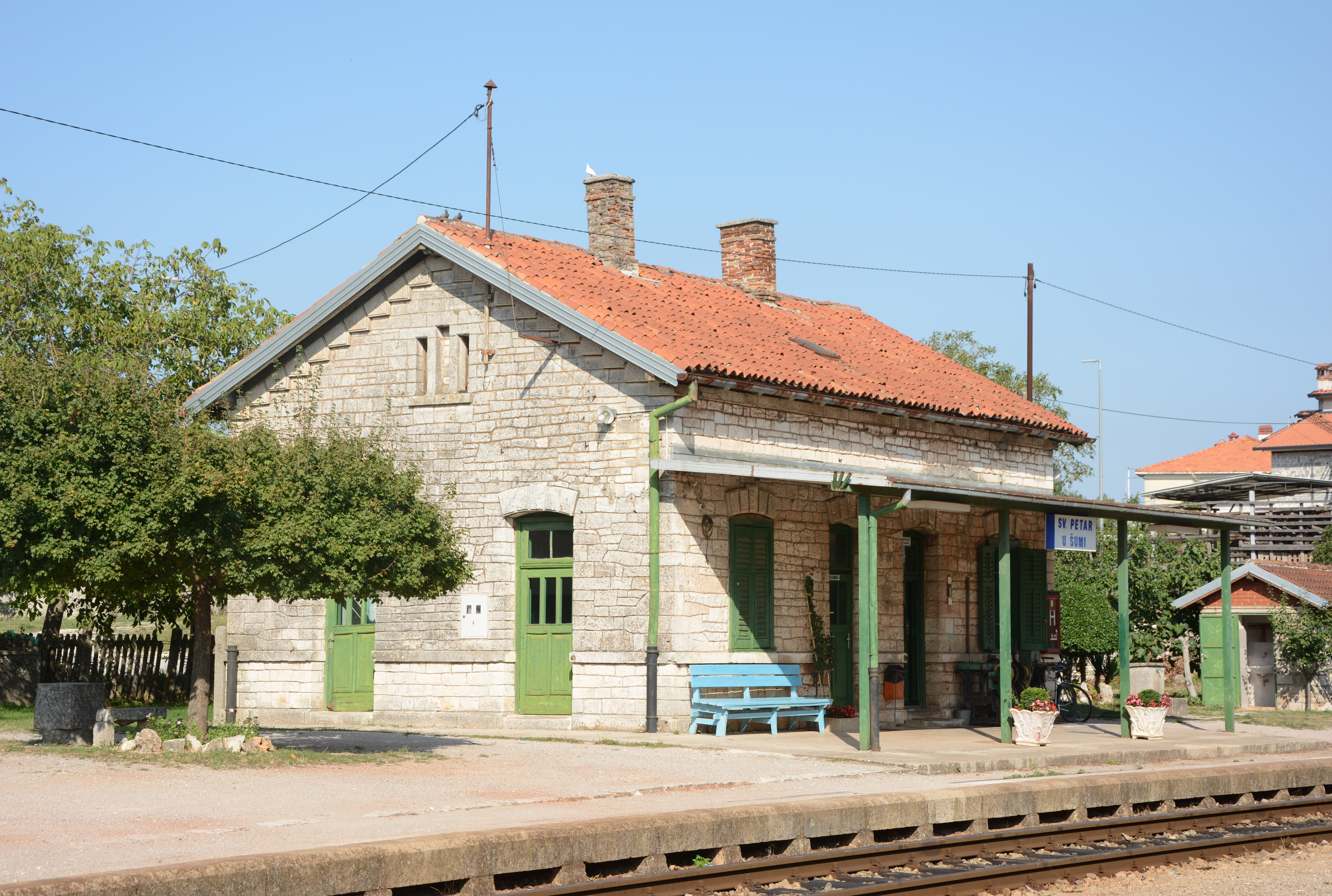
- Train station

- Flag
- Interactive map of Sveti Petar u Šumi
- Location within Croatia
- Coordinates: 45°11′N 13°52′E
- Country: Croatia
- County: Istria County

Government
  - Mayor: Mario Bratulić (HDZ)

Area
  - Municipality: 5.5 sq mi (14.2 km^{2})
  - Urban: 5.5 sq mi (14.2 km^{2})

Population (2021)
  - Municipality: 1,051
  - Density: 192/sq mi (74.0/km^{2})
  - Urban: 1,051
  - Urban density: 192/sq mi (74.0/km^{2})
- Time zone: UTC+1 (CET)
  - Summer (DST): UTC+2 (CEST)
- Area code: 52
- Website: svpetarusumi.hr

Sveti Petar u Šumi (Italian: San Pietro in Selve; archaic German: Sankt Peter im Walde) is the only village in the eponymous municipality (općina) in Istria County, west Croatia.

== Geography ==
It is located within the centre of the Istrian peninsula near the regional capital Pazin, about 6 km (3.7 mi) northwest of Žminj.

== History ==
The settlement in the March of Istria arose around the Benedictine Saint Peter and Paul Abbey, probably founded in the 1130s and first mentioned about 1174/76. The abandoned monastery was dedicated to the Order of Saint Paul the First Hermit by the Habsburg emperor Frederick III with the consent of Pope Pius II in 1459. The present-day Baroque monastery complex was finished in 1731. The Pauline abbey was dissolved by Emperor Joseph II in 1782 but re-established in 1993.

== Demographics ==
According to the 2021 census, its population was 1,051. The population was 1,065 (as of the 2011 census).

Sveti Petar u Šumi: Population trends 1857–2021
v

population	847	876	975	1039	1101	1267	1217	1184	1165	1173	1123	1057	999	999	1011	1065	1051
	1857	1869	1880	1890	1900	1910	1921	1931	1948	1953	1961	1971	1981	1991	2001	2011	2021

Sources: Croatian Bureau of Statistics publications
