= Otto I of Scheyern-Dachau-Valley =

German nobleman

Otto I, Count of Scheyern-Dachau-Valley
- Born: probably: Dachau
- Died: after 5 November 1130 probably: Valley
- Noble family: House of Wittelsbach
- Spouse: Adelaide of Weilheim
- Father: Arnold I, Count of Scheyern
- Mother: Beatrix of Reipersberg

Otto I, Count of Scheyern-Dachau-Valley (also known as Otto of Dachau-Valley; died after 5 November 1130) was a German nobleman. He was a son of Count Arnold I of Scheyern and Beatrix of Reipersberg. Otto I was the founder of the Scheyern-Dachau-Valley line.

== Life ==
He acquired the town of Grub via his wife. In 1122, he founded the town of Bernried am Starnberger See and became its vogt. In 1124, he acquired Dachau and the County of Valley (Valley, Bavaria). The branch of the House of Wittelsbach which descended from him, was named after these possessions.

== Marriage and issue ==
Otto married Adelaide of Weilheim. Together, they had five children:

- Gebhard (d. 1141)
- Conrad I (d. 1175)
- Adelaide, married Count Engelbert II of Gorizia
- Otto II (d. c. 1170/1172)
- Matilda

== Sources ==
- Scherbaum, Walburga, ed. (2011). Die Bistümer der Kirchenprovinz Mainz. Das Bistum Augsburg 3. Vol. 3. Walter de Gruyter. ISBN 978-3-11-025182-1.
- Slides including a family tree of the Counts of Scheyern-Dachau-Valley from a presentation by prof. Schmid Bayern im Spätmittelalter, WS 1996/97
