= Lim (Croatia) =

Bay in west Croatia

Coordinates: 45°07′59″N 13°38′08″E

- Interactive map of Lim

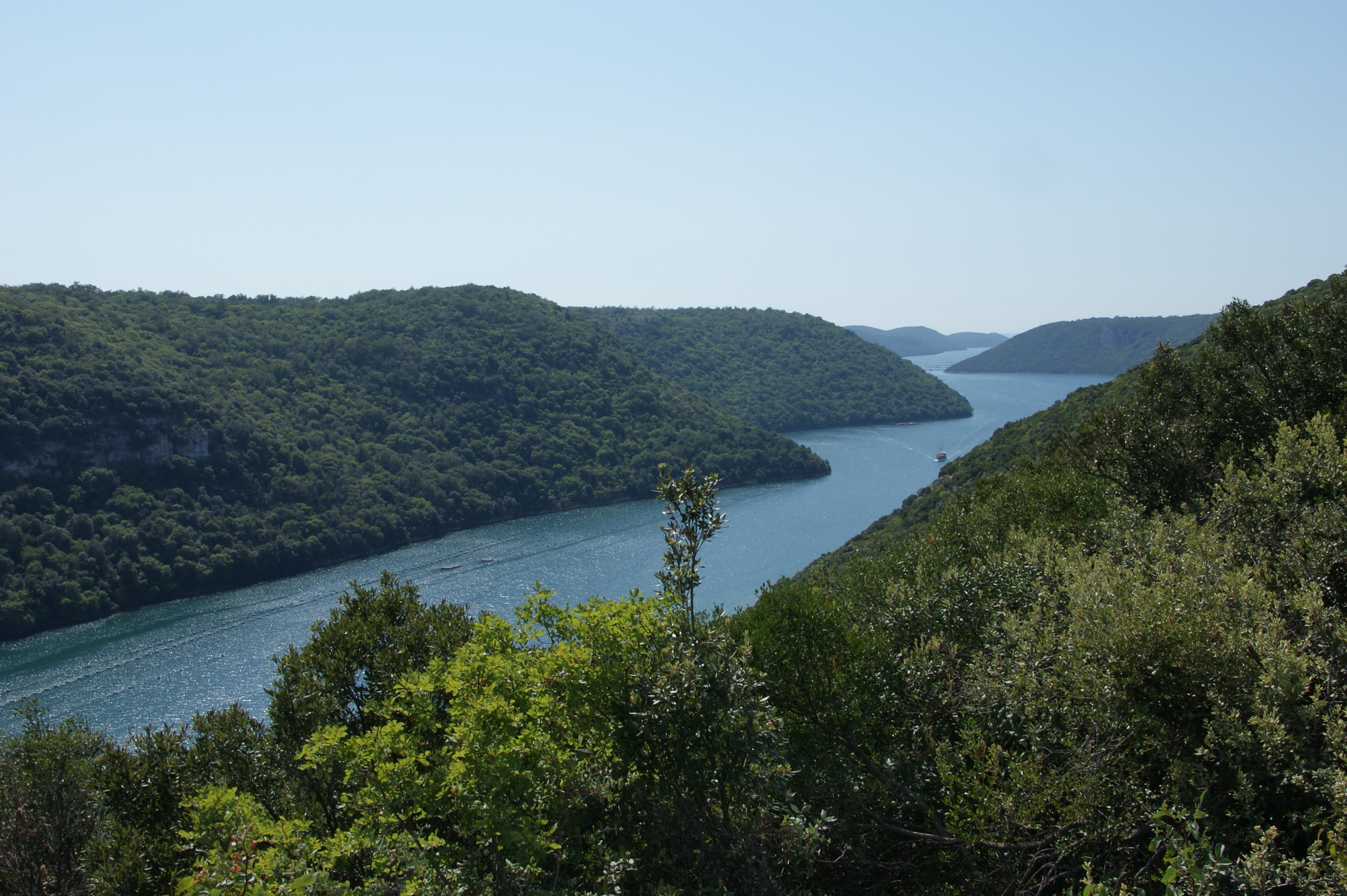
Lim channel

The Lim bay (Croatian: Limski zaljev, Italian: Canale di Leme) and valley is a peculiar geographic feature found near Rovinj and Vrsar on the western coast of Istria, south of Poreč, west Croatia. The name comes from the Latin limes for "limit", referring to the landform's position at the border of two Roman provinces: Dalmatia and Italia.

== Geography ==
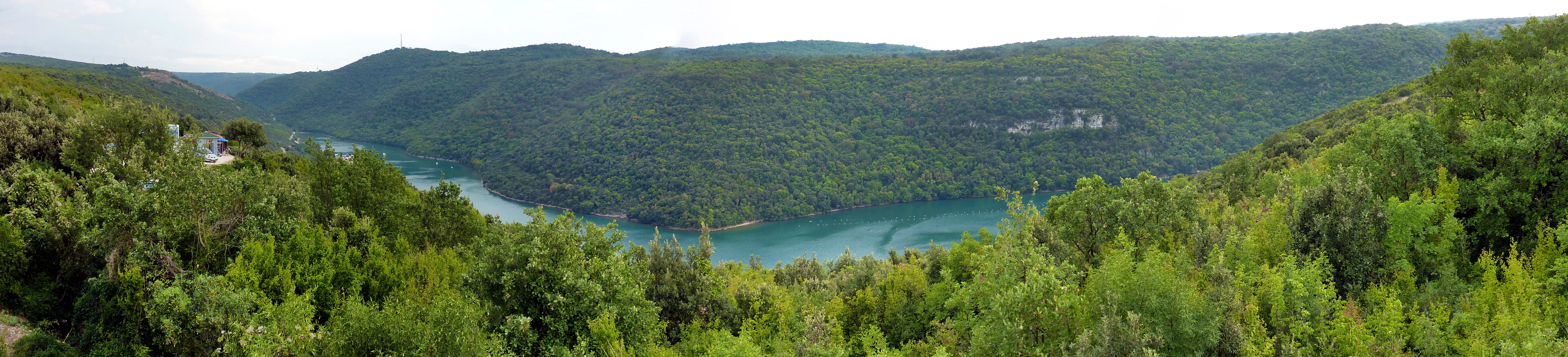
Lim panoramic view seen from observation platform

The Lim valley (Limska dolina) is the 35 km long valley of the river Pazinčica, which transforms into the Lim bay (Limski zaljev), a 10 kilometer long estuary. The Croats sometimes also call it Limski kanal ("Lim channel"), due to its narrow width. The estuary is sometimes called a fjord, although it is not in fact a fjord but a ria, because it was not carved by a glacier but by the river eroding the ground on its way to the Adriatic Sea, when the sea level was lower.

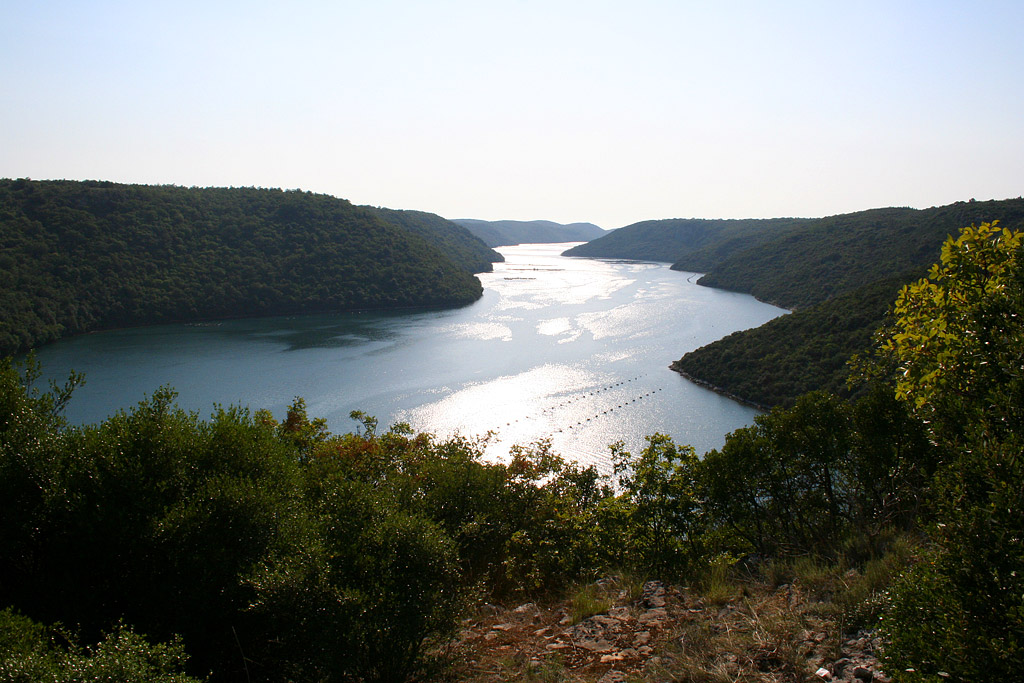
Another view of the Lim channel

Owing to its geological history, this estuary is one of the most instructive examples of limestone hydrological development. The Lim stream used to flow through the valley but dried up regularly, and was really only present after the heavy rain. The Lim estuary has the appearance of a canyon. The side rises to 150 m, sinking to 20 m when they reach the sea; they are overgrown with maquis and have some special characteristics. The south bank, facing the north, is covered with deciduous trees (oak and ash), while the north bank, facing the sun, has more evergreen flora. The vegetation has recently suffered a great deal from fires. The estuary is rich in fish, and high quality oysters and mussels. Because of the special conditions of the sea water in the channel (less salt content, a higher concentration of dissolved oxygen and well-researched temperature gradients) sea flora and fauna are particularly well developed.

The channel is a natural breeding ground and wintering place for many breeds of fish. For this reason it is a special reserve, protected by a conservation order. The locals grow some fish and oysters there.

== In popular culture ==
The movie The Long Ships starring Richard Widmark and Sidney Poitier was shot there in 1964.

== See also ==
- Dvigrad
