= John II of Gorizia =

John II
- Count of Gorizia
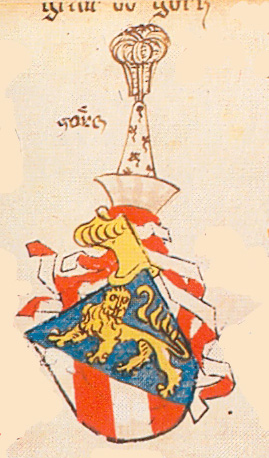
- Coat of arms of the Albertine line of the Counts of Gorizia, in the Ingeram Codex, 1459
- Born: c. 1438
- Died: 22 May 1462; Lienz, County of Gorizia
- Noble family: Meinhardiner
- Father: Henry VI, Count of Gorizia
- Mother: Catherine of Gara

John II of Gorizia (German: Johann II. von Görz, Slovene: Janž Goriški or Ivan Goriški, Italian: Giovanni di Gorizia c. 1438 – 22 May 1462) was the penultimate Count of Gorizia. He ruled the County of Gorizia from 1454 until his death.

== Life ==
John II was the eldest son of Count Henry VI of Gorizia (1376–1454) from his second marriage with Catherine, daughter of Nicholas II Garai (Miklós Garai), Palatine of Hungary. Under the long rule of his father, the County of Gorizia had suffered a steep decline. Henry had first married Elizabeth (d. 1436), a daughter of Count Hermann II of Celje, and after her early death remained a loyal ally of the Counts of Celje. He and Count Ulrich II of Celje signed an inheritance treaty in 1437, which brought him in conflict with his mighty neighbors, the Republic of Venice and the Habsburg duke Frederick V of Austria (later Emperor Frederick III), and even with his second wife.

Henry agreed to betroth his son John to Elizabeth of Celje, the daughter of Count Ulrich II, a project that ulimatively was not realized. Elisabeth was betrothed to Matthias Corvinus, future king of Hungary, in a futile attempt to reconcile the houses of Celje and Hunyadi. Elisabeth died in her teens, and John remained unmarried.

Young John was held hostage in Celje from 1444, together with his younger brother Leonhard. As future correspondence with Katarina Branković, last countess of Celje, shows, the relation between the young Görz princes and the Celje court were cordial. Their captivity can be seen as an attempt to keep the Counts of Gorizia within the Celje power orbit. Such alliance was strongly favored by the boys' father, but opposed by their mother, Catherine Garai, who despite being related to the Celjes, favored the Habsburgs.

After his release upon his father's death in 1454, John took up government in Gorizia. In November 1456, he was part of the entourage of Ulrich II of Celje and Ladislaus the Posthumous that was supposed to take over Belgrade Fortress from Hunyadi troops that had just repelled an Ottoman siege. Ulrich was assassinated by the Hunyadis, and John went on to claim the extinct Ortenburg estates in the Duchy of Carinthia (around Millstatt and Spittal an der Drau), which were bordering the Gorizia palatine county in the upper Drava valley.

However, his claim was unsuccessful. Nevertheless, he went on to occupy and plunder the Ortenburg lands, until he was finally defeated by the Habsburg forces of Emperor Frederick III in 1460, under the command of the Bohemian condottiere Jan Vitovec who had previously served the Counts of Celje. A peace treaty was signed at Feldsberg Castle, whereupon Count John was forced to renounce the Ortenburg estates and to cede twelve Gorizia fortresses as a reparation, including his Lienz residence at Bruck Castle. His brother, with the help of the advisor Virgil von Graben, was able to reclaim the latter after pledging alliegance to the Habsburgs.

John II died in 1462 at his Lienz residence and was deeply mourned by his subjects, due to him having been very popular. He was succeeded by his younger brother Leonhard. With Leonhard's death in 1500, the House of Gorizia went extinct.

== Ancestry ==
Ancestors of John II of Gorizia

16. Albert I of Gorizia
8. Albert II of Gorizia
17. Euphemia of Głogów
4. Meinhard VI of Gorizia
18. Ulrich II of Mätsch
9. Euphemia of Mätsch
19. Margareth of Vatz
2. Henry VI, Count of Gorizia
20. Albero of Mätsch
10. Ulrich IV of Mätsch
21. Sophia of Velturns
5. Utehild of Mätsch
22. Eberhard VI of Kirchberg
11. Agnes, Countess of Kirchberg
23. Agnes of Werdenberg-Heiligenberg-Bludenz
1. John II, Count of Gorizia
24. Andrew Garai
12. Nicholas I Garai
6. Nicholas II Garai
3. Catherine Gara
28. Hermann I, Count of Celje
14. Hermann II of Celje
29. Catherine of Bosnia
7. Anna of Celje
30. Count Henry VII of Schaunberg
15. Anna of Schaunberg
31. Ursula of Gorizia

John II of Gorizia Meinhardiner Born: c. 1433 Died: 22 May 1462
Preceded by Henry VI	Count of Gorizia; 1454-1462	Succeeded by Leonhard
