= Simon von Taisten =

Tyrolean painter (c.1450–c.1515)

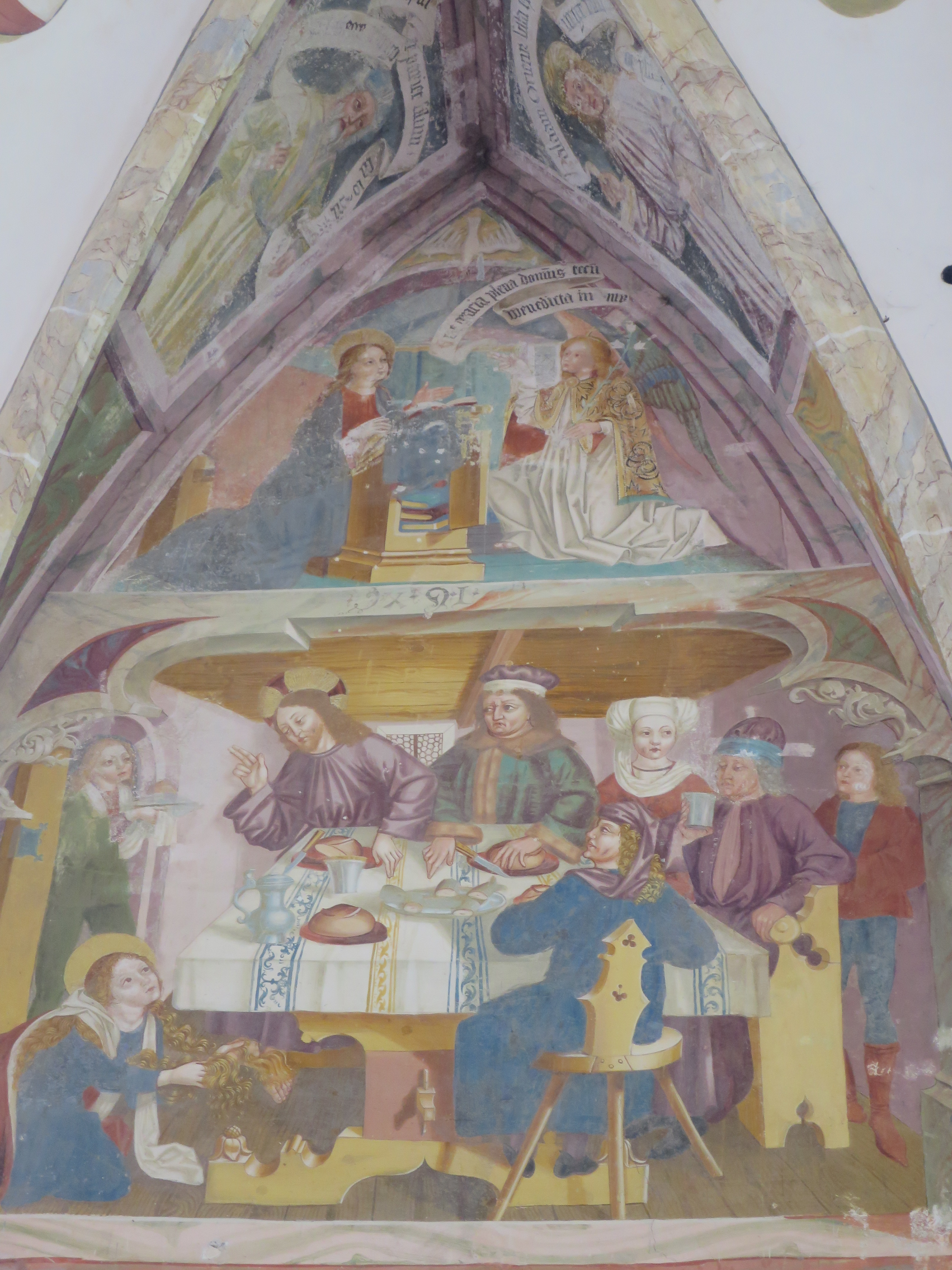
Mooskirche, Niederdorf. Top: The Annunciation. Middle: Isaias and Balaam. Bottom: Feast in the House of Simon the Pharisee

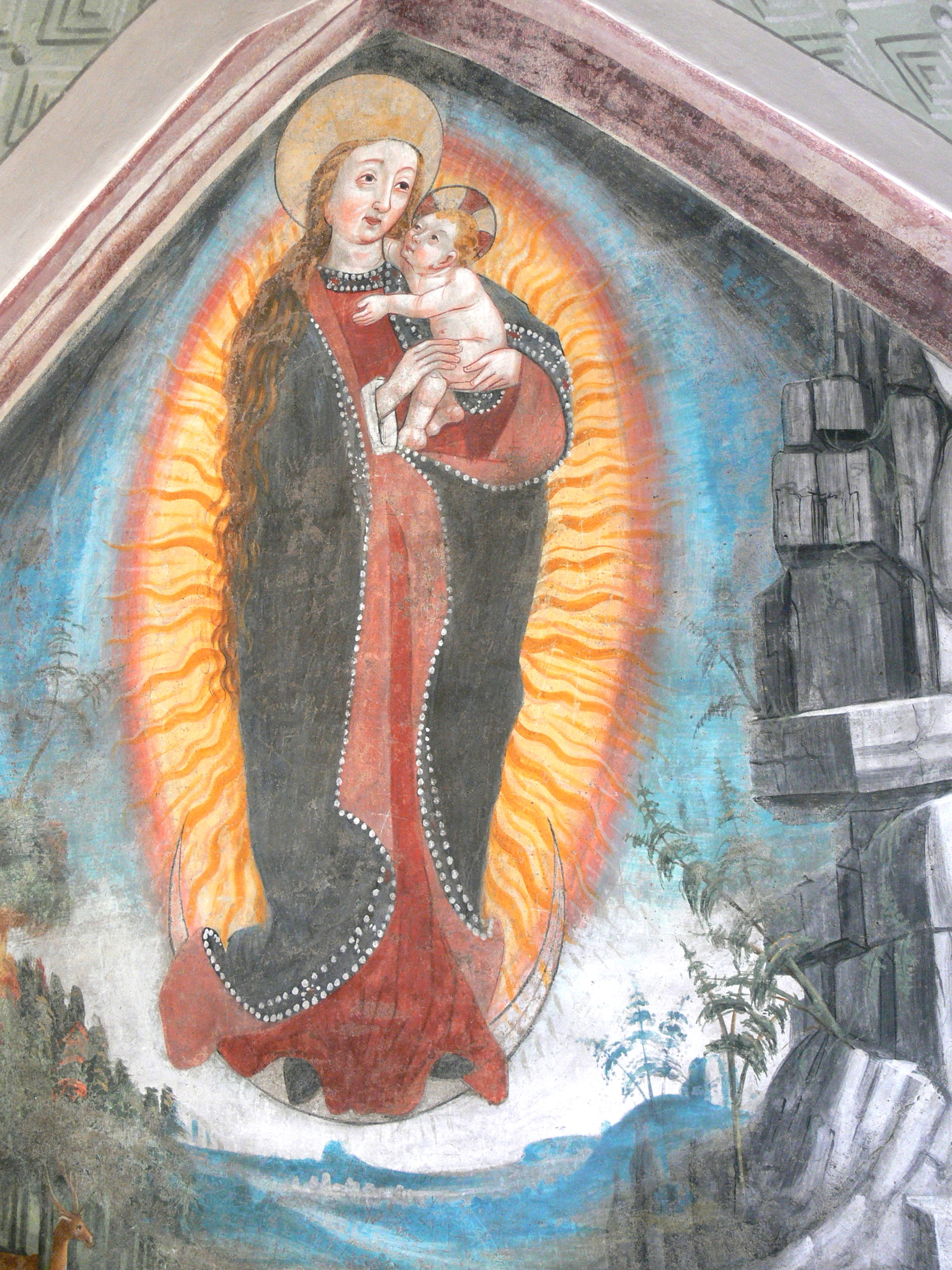
Madonna and Child, parish church, Olang

Simon von Taisten, originally known as Simon Mareigl or Marenkl (c.1450/55 in Taisten – c.1515), was a Tyrolean painter in the Late Gothic style. He created numerous frescoes, panel paintings, and altarpieces in Gorizia, the Puster Valley, Lienz District, and Carinthia.

== Biography ==
His original name refers to an estate near where he was born (Marenklhof). His initial artistic education came from Leonhard von Brixen, a painter and woodcutter. After he died in 1474, Simon moved to the workshop of Friedrich und Michael Pacher, where he became acquainted with contemporary trends in art. While there, he and his brother, Veit (?-c.1520), collaborated with a woodcarving shop to create altarpieces.

His earliest works are in the Benedictine monastery in Sonnenburg. His habit of dating his works makes it easy to trace his activities. In 1479, he was working in the church at Vierschach (Innichen), in 1481 in Olang and Taisten then, after 1484, at the pilgrimage church in Obermauern (Virgen), creating 29 scenes of the Passion of Jesus and the martyrdom of St. Sebastian. In 1490, he was painting more Passion scenes in Taisten. The years 1491/92 saw him doing frescoes in Niederdorf. From 1495 to 1500, he was back in Obermauern painting a church choir. In 1505, he did some work in Dietenheim (Bruneck), and 1506 found him decorating the chapel at Burg Bruck in Lienz; to sum up his most important works. Many of them included portraits or the coats-of-arms of their sponsors.

Towards the end of the 1480s, it is possible to see some Italian influence in his work. This suggests a visit to Friuli or even Padua, made more likely by his business relationship with Count Leonhard of Gorizia and his wife Paola Gonzaga, originally from Mantua.

Although best known for his religious frescoes, he also engaged in some non-religious work. This is testified to in a letter from 1507, in which Simon addresses King (later Emperor) Maximilian I, requesting payment for some work he had done in the main square of Lienz; enumerating types of vehicles, costumes, etc., apparently done for a celebration of some sort, as they had disappeared. He received payment by installments through 1509.

The dates of his works suggest that he died sometime around 1515.
