= Sieghardinger =

Bavarian noble family

The Sieghardinger dynasty was one of the most important families of the Bavarian nobility from the middle of the 9th to the beginning of the 13th century. The name of the family comes from "Sieghard" (also Sighard or Sigehard), the name of its founder. The family went extinct at the end of the 12th century.

== History ==
The ancestors of the Sieghardinger family were wealthy in the Rhine-Neckar region. The Sieghardinger - with the progenitor Sieghard I (mentioned in 858/861), Count in Kraichgau - ruled for about two centuries as counts in Chiemgau, and in other areas; these included areas in Pinzgau, Pongau, Flachgau, Eisacktal, Inntal and in the Puster Valley. In the first half of the 11th century, the Sieghardingers were Counts of Ebersberg and Margraves of Carniola.

A subsidiary branch was that of the Counts of Tengling, from whom the Counts of Schala, Burghausen, Peilstein, Mörle and Kleeberg, descended but soon after died out at the end of the 12th century. The Meinhardiner (House of Gorizia) are also said to have descended from the Sieghardinger family.

The extensive property that the family had acquired in Carinthia was inherited by the Sponheim family.

Other members of the family named Sighard and Friedrich registered in 987 for the Swabian Ellwangen. Their heirs are said to have become related to high-ranking Swabian families in the next generations, e.g. with a daughter of the Swabian Duke Conrad I, the Swabian Count Palatine, and after 1079 the Swabian duchy and after 1138 the German kingship. From Friedrich the imperial family Hohenstaufen is said to have emerged.

Important Sieghardingers in clerical offices were:

- Frederick, Archbishop of Salzburg (958–991)
- Piligrim, Bishop of Passau (971–991)
- Hartwig, Bishop of Brixen (1022–1039)
- Sigehard, Patriarch of Aquileia (1068-1077) and Chancellor of Henry IV.

== Sources ==
- Heinz Dopsch: Sighardinger. In: Neue Deutsche Biographie (NDB). Band 24, Duncker & Humblot, Berlin 2010, ISBN 978-3-428-11205-0, S. 399 f. (Digitalisat). (German)
- Michael Mitterauer: Karolingische Markgrafen im Südosten. Archiv für österr. Geschichte, 123. Band. Böhlau, Graz-Wien-Köln 1963 (Dissertation). Nachweis zu Michael Mitterauer: Karolingische Markgrafen im Südosten in der Deutschen Nationalbibliothek. (German)
- Siegfried Mueller: Die Grafen von Tengling. Die Adelssippe der Sighardinger von den Ursprüngen bis um 1140.Tengling 2015. 176 Seiten. ISBN 9783737535564. (German)
