= Henry VI of Gorizia =

Henry VI
- Count of Gorizia
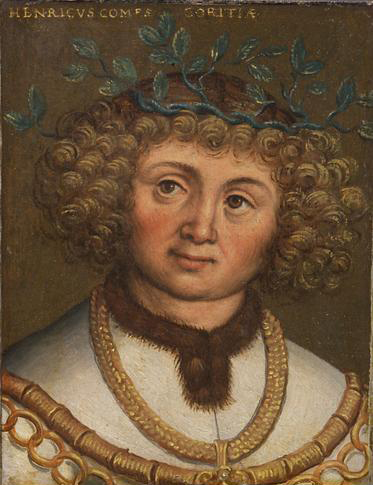
- Portrait by Anton Boys, 16th century
- Born: 1376
- Died: 1454 (Aged 77 – 78)
- Noble family: House of Gorizia
- Spouses: Elisabeth of Celje; Catherine of Gara
- Issue: John II; Leonhard
- Father: Meinhard VI of Gorizia
- Mother: Utehild of Mätsch

Henry VI (1376–1454), a member of the House of Gorizia (Meinhardiner dynasty), ruled as Count of Gorizia from 1385 until his death. He was also Count Palatine of Carinthia (a hereditary title), governor of Belluno-Feltre and Landeshauptmann of Carniola. Through his first marriage with Elizabeth of Cilli, he was the brother-in-law of Sigismund of Luxembourg, Holy Roman Emperor and King of Hungary.

== Life ==
Henry's parents were Count Meinhard VI and his wife, Utehild of Mätsch. His father had outlived his elder brother and became sole ruler in 1365. Upon his death about 1385, Henry succeeded him as Count of Gorizia (Görz). His estates went into a rapid decline, as he turned out to be an "incurable drunkard and gambler".

Since Henry's cousin Countess Margaret had bequeathed her Tyrolean estates to the Habsburg duke Rudolf IV of Austria in 1363, the Counts of Gorizia were thrown back on their original possessions around Gorizia and Lienz (Bruck Castle). Henry likewise concluded an inheritance treaty with the Habsburg dynasty; this didn't go down well with his other neighbours, the Wittelsbach dukes of Bavaria and the Republic of Venice.

After the death of his younger brother John Meinhard VII in 1430, he also inherited the Swabian county of Kirchberg from the estate of his mother.

== Marriages and issue ==
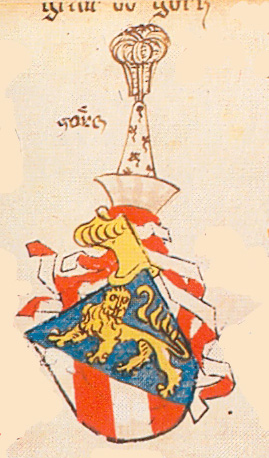
Coat of arms of the Albertine line of the Counts of Gorizia, Ingeram Codex, 1459

Henry was engaged with Elizabeth (d. 1392), a daughter of the Habsburg duke Leopold III of Austria. However, on 31 January 1400, he married another Elizabeth (d. 1426), a younger daughter of Count Herman II of Celje. Through this marriage, he eventually became the brother in law of the Emperor Sigismund of Luxembourg.

With Elisabeth, he had two daughters:

- Anna, married to Brunoro della Scala (d. 1437)
- Margaret (d. 1450), married Count John of Oettingen-Wallerstein (d. 1449)

After Elizabeth's death, Henry married Catherine (Katalin; d. 1471/83), a daughter of the Hungarian palatine Nicholas II Garai. He was described as a "rugged opponent" of Catherine, as she was politically inclined to side with the Habsburgs, while he was siding with the Celje relatives of his first wife. He had three sons with Catherine:

- John II (1438–1462), succeeded his father as Count of Gorizia in 1454
- Leonhard (1440–1500), succeeded his elder brother in 1462, last Count of Gorizia
- Louis (d. 1457)

Henry VI of Gorizia House of Gorizia Born: 1376 Died: 1454
| Preceded by Meinhard VI | Count of Gorizia; 1385-1454 | Succeeded by John II |
