= County of Gorizia =

State of the Holy Roman Empire (c.1117–1500)

(Princely) County of Gorizia Contea (Principesca) di Gorizia (Italian) (Gefürstete) Grafschaft Görz (German)
- c. 1117–1500
- Flag Coat of arms

- County of Gorizia (red) at the time of the Hohenstaufen Emperors (circa 1250); the highlighted area roughly corresponds with the later Austrian Circle, which is provided for context only.

- Map of the Habsburg hereditary lands around 1526. The County of Gorizia in yellow.
- Status: State of the Holy Roman Empire
- Capital: Gorizia; Lienz
- Official languages: Latin
- Common languages: Italian; German; Friulian; Slovene
- Religion: Roman Catholicism
- Government: County
- Count
  - 1122–1142: Meinhard I
  - 1454–1500: Leonhard
- Historical era: Middle Ages
  - Meinhard, Count of Gorizia: c. 1117
  - Meinhard III inherited Tyrol: 1253
  - Raised to principality: 1365
  - Bequeathed to House of Habsburg: 1500
  - Joined Austrian Circle: 1512
  - Reunited with Gradisca: 1500
- Currency: Gorizian Denar
Preceded by	Succeeded by
Patria del Friuli	Princely County of Gorizia and Gradisca

The County of Gorizia (Italian: Contea di Gorizia, German: Grafschaft Görz, Slovene: Goriška grofija, Friulian: Contee di Gurize), from 1365 Princely County of Gorizia, was a State of the Holy Roman Empire. Originally mediate Vogts of the Patriarchs of Aquileia, the Counts of Gorizia (Meinhardiner) ruled over several fiefs in the area of Lienz and in the Friuli region of northeastern Italy with their residence at Gorizia (Görz).

In 1253 the Counts of Gorizia inherited the County of Tyrol, from 1271 onwards ruled by the Gorizia-Tyrol branch which became extinct in the male line in 1335. The younger line ruled the comital lands of Gorizia and Lienz until its extinction in 1500, whereafter the estates were finally acquired by the Austrian House of Habsburg.

== History ==
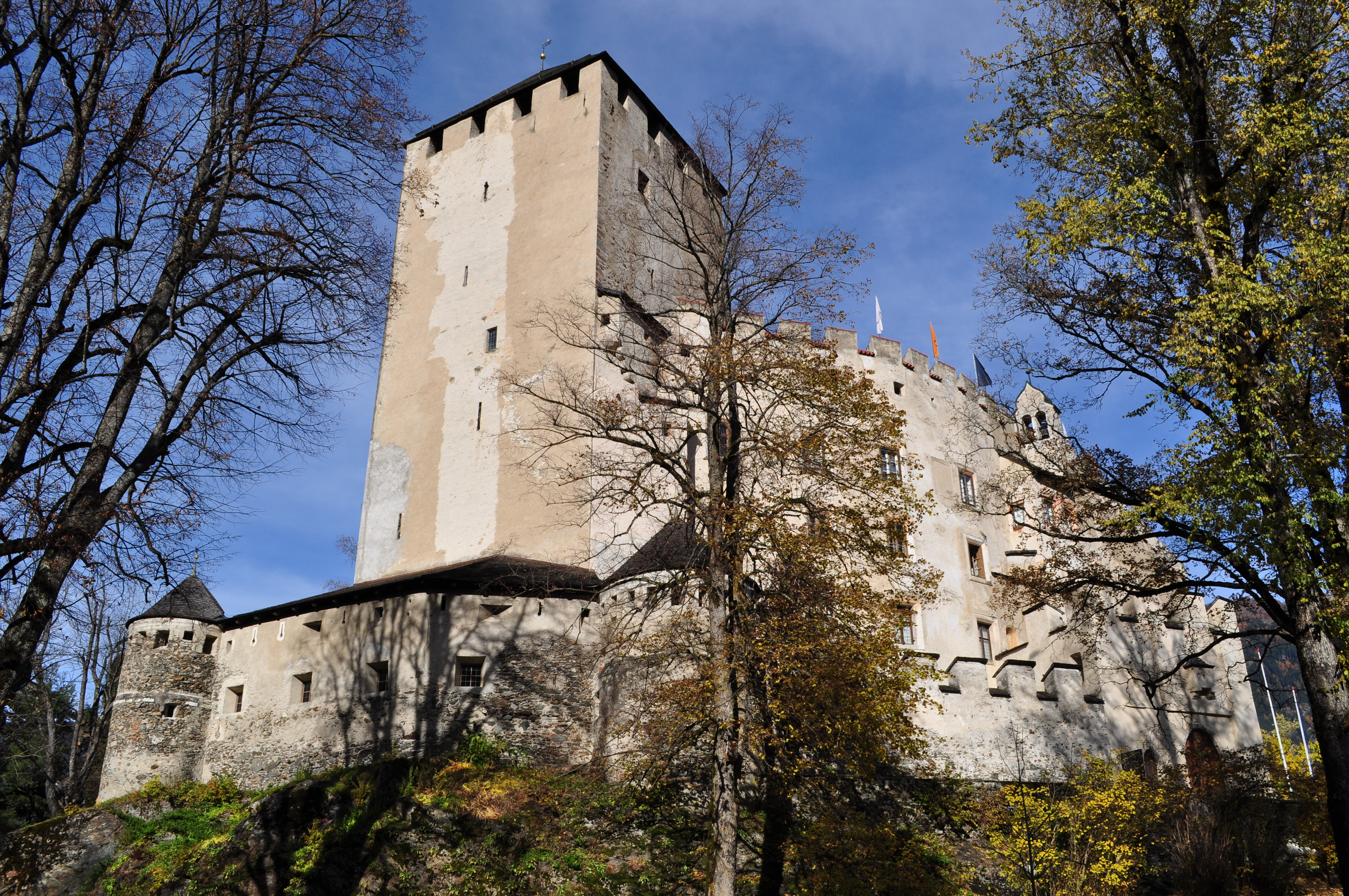
Bruck Castle, Lienz

=== Gorizia (House of Meinhardin) ===
Count Meinhard I, a descendant of the Meinhardiner noble family with possessions around Lienz in the Duchy of Bavaria, is mentioned as a count as early as 1117. As a vogt official of the Patriarchs of Aquileia, he was enfeoffed with large estates in the former March of Friuli, including the town of Gorizia.

The borders of the county changed frequently in the following four centuries, due to frequent wars with Aquileia and other counties, but also to the subdivision of the territory in two main nuclei: one around the Bavarian ancestral seat of Lienz on the upper Drava River up to Innichen in the Puster Valley, the other centered on Gorizia in Friuli itself.

=== Gorizia-Tyrol (House of Meinhardin) ===
Meinhard's descendant Count Meinhard III of Gorizia, a follower of the Hohenstaufen emperor Frederick II, upon the extinction of the ducal House of Babenberg was appointed administrator of Styria in 1248. He invaded the adjacent Duchy of Carinthia but was defeated by the troops of Duke Bernhard von Spanheim and his son Archbishop Philip of Salzburg at Greifenburg in 1252. Nevertheless, the county reached the apex of its power, when Meinhard III inherited County of Tyrol (as Meinhard I) from his father-in-law Count Albert IV one year later.

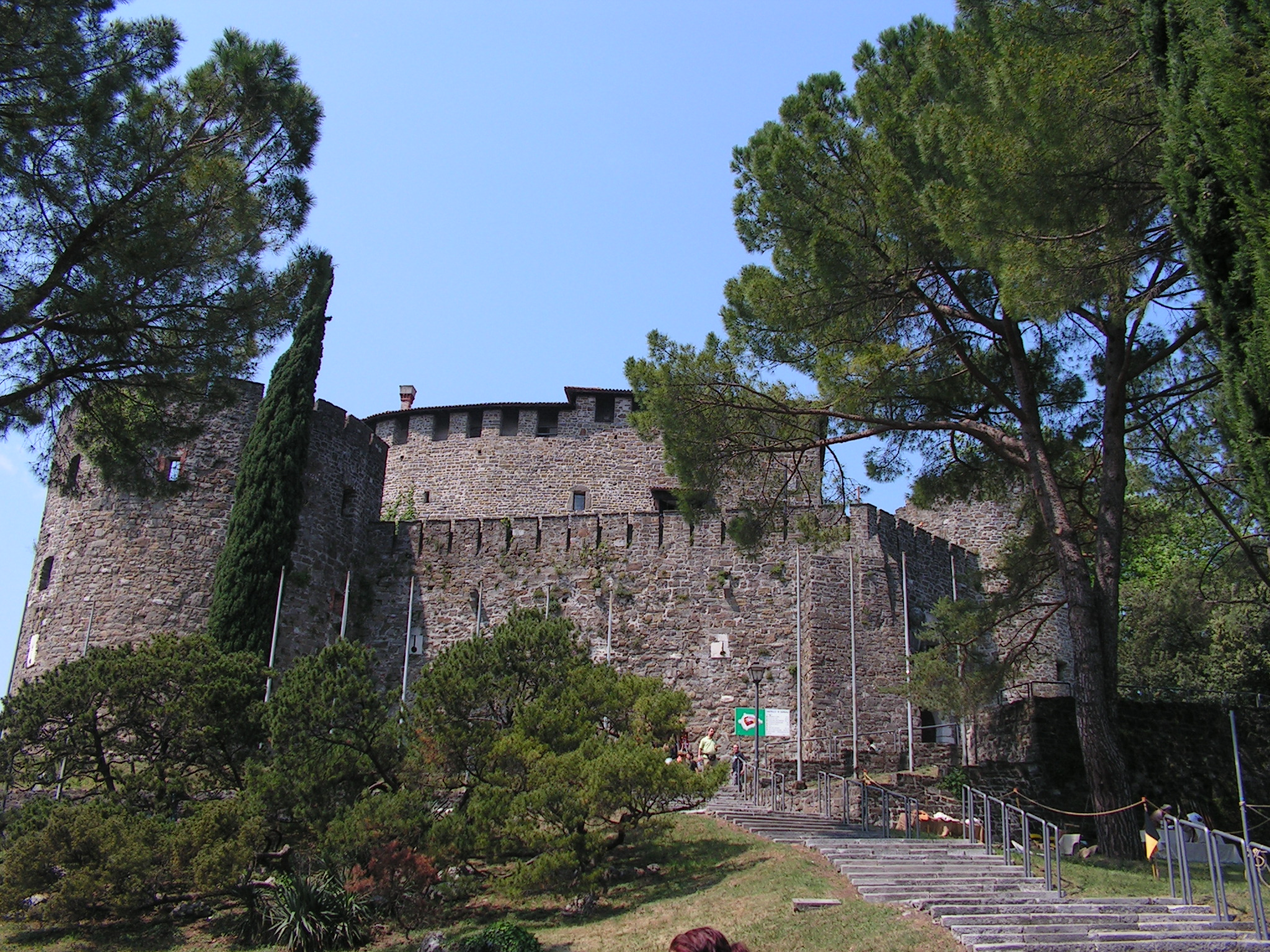
Gorizia Castle

After Count Meinhard III died in 1258, his sons at first ruled jointly until in 1271 they divided their heritage: While the elder Meinhard IV took the comital Tyrolean lands west of the Puster Valley, his brother Albert retained the Meinhardiner ancestral lands around Lienz and Gorizia. After his death, the County of Gorizia was again partitioned among his sons into the "inner county" of Gorizia, ruled by Henry III, and the "outer county" around Lienz under Albert II. When Count Henry III was assassinated in 1323, the Gorizia lands were split into four domains. The Counts of Gorizia temporarily controlled the Italian March of Treviso (Marca Trevigiana) and the remains of the Istrian march around Pazin (Mitterburg), which Count Albert III of Görz bequeathed to the House of Habsburg in 1365.

In 1365 Count Meinhard VI of Görz was granted the princely title by the Luxembourg emperor Charles IV, the county was thereon called Gefürstete Grafschaft Görz. The Meinhardiner nevertheless suffered a steep decline under their powerful neighbors, the Austrian lands of the Habsburg dynasty and the Republic of Venice.

=== Gorizia (House of Meinhardin) ===
After the Habsburgs had acquired the Carinthian duchy with the March of Carniola in 1335 and the County of Tyrol in 1363, the remaining Gorizia lands of Lienz were a thorn in their side, separating the dynasty's "hereditary lands". Venice had conquered the former Patriarchate territories in Friuli, which were incorporated into the Domini di Terraferma by 1434. The Council of Ten strived for the adjacent "inner county" lands around Gorizia up to the Venetian Stato da Màr territories in Istria. Due to the pressure, the Gorizia counts took their residence at Bruck Castle in Lienz.

In 1429 the county was reunited under the single rule of Count Henry VI. His son, the last count Leonhard, died in 1500 and despite claims raised by Venice, according to a contract of inheritance and the active support of the Gorizia governor Virgil von Graben the county fell to the Habsburg emperor Maximilian I.

=== Habsburg ===
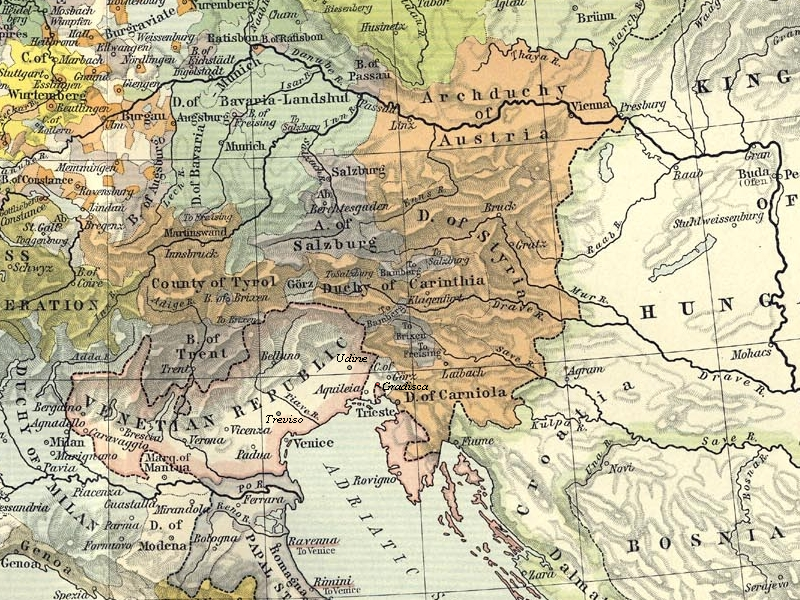
Inner and Outer Gorizia territories (in white), late 15th century

While the Lienz area was administered with the Tyrolean crown land, the "inner county" of Gorizia remained an Imperial State of the Holy Roman Empire ruled by the Inner Austrian Archdukes as part of the Austrian Circle, governed by a capitano. Its territory included the Isonzo Valley down to Aquileia, the area of Cormons and Duino, and the former Venetian fortress of Gradisca, which was conquered by Imperial troops in 1511. Monfalcone formed a Venetian exclave in the county from 1420 to 1797. In 1647 Emperor Ferdinand III separated the "Principality of Gradisca" from Gorizia for his courtier Johann Anton von Eggenberg, until in 1747 both were again merged to form the Princely County of Gorizia and Gradisca, a crown land of the Habsburg monarchy.

== Counts ==
=== Houses of Eppenstein and Siegharding ===
- Marquard (E) (fl. 1060/1074), Vogt of Aquileia
- Meginhard (S) (died about 1090), from the House of Siegharding, Count in the Puster Valley
- Henry I (E) (died after 1102), Vogt of Aquileia from 1082
  - Ulrich (E) (died 1122), brother

=== Meinhard dynasty ===
==== Partitions of Gorizian territories under Meinhard dynasty rule ====
	County of Tyrol (c.1050-1253)
County of Gorizia (1090-1500)	County of Tyrol (1258-1363)
Annexed to the House of Habsburg

==== Table of rulers ====
Ruler	Born	Reign	Ruling part	Consort	Death	Notes
Engelbert I	c.1050 First son of either Henry of Eppenstein or Meginhard, Count in the Puster Valley	1090 – 14 December 1122	County of Gorizia	Unknown	14 December 1122 aged 71–72	Also Count Palatine of Bavaria.
Meinhard I	c.1070 Second son of either Henry of Eppenstein or Meginhard, Count in the Puster Valley	14 December 1122 – 1142	County of Gorizia	Hildegard no children Elisabeth of Schwarzenberg four children	1142 aged	Brother of the predecessor.
Henry II	c.1120 First son of Meinhard I and Elisabeth of Schwarzenberg	1142 – 11 October 1149	County of Gorizia	Unknown	11 October 1149 aged 28–29	Children of Meinhard, ruled jointly. Engelbert was also titular Margrave of Istria from 1188.
Engelbert II	c.1120 Second son of Meinhard I and Elisabeth of Schwarzenberg	1142 – 1 April 1191	County of Gorizia	Adelaide of Scheyern-Dachau-Valley three children	1 April 1191 aged 70–71?	Children of Meinhard, ruled jointly. Engelbert was also titular Margrave of Istria from 1188.
Meinhard II the Elder	1163; Second son of Meinhard I and Elisabeth of Schwarzenberg	1 April 1191 – 1231	County of Gorizia	Kunigunde of Peilstein no children Adelaide no children A daughter of Henry I, Count of Tyrol no children	1231 aged 67–68	Children of Engelbert II, ruled jointly. Meinhard was also Vogt of the Patriarchate of Aquileia.
Engelbert III	1164; First son of Meinhard I and Elisabeth of Schwarzenberg	1 April 1191 – 1220	County of Gorizia	Matilda of Pisino; 1183 no children Matilda of Andechs; 1190 one child	1220 aged 55–56	Children of Engelbert II, ruled jointly. Meinhard was also Vogt of the Patriarchate of Aquileia.
Meinhard III	1200; Son of Engelbert III and Matilda of Andechs	1231 – 22 July 1258	County of Gorizia (with County of Tyrol from 1253)	Adelaide of Tyrol c.1237 four children	22 July 1258 aged 57–58	Through his marriage he inherited the County of Tyrol.
Meinhard IV	1238; Landshut; First son of Meinhard III and Adelaide of Tyrol	22 July 1258 – 1 November 1295	County of Tyrol (with Duchy of Carinthia and March of Carniola since 1286)	Elisabeth of Bavaria; 6 October 1259; Munich six children	1 November 1295; Greifenburg aged 56–57	Children of Meinhard II, ruled jointly until 1271, when they divided their inheritance. In 1286, Meinhard was also enfeoffed with the Duchy of Carinthia and the adjacent March of Carniola.
Albert I	1240; Second son of Meinhard III and Adelaide of Tyrol	22 July 1258 – 1 April 1304	County of Gorizia	Euphemia of Glogow three children Euphemia of Ortenburg no children	1 April 1304; Lüenz aged 63–64	Children of Meinhard II, ruled jointly until 1271, when they divided their inheritance. In 1286, Meinhard was also enfeoffed with the Duchy of Carinthia and the adjacent March of Carniola.
Otto (Note: Otto III as duke of Carinthia.)	c.1265 Second son of Meinhard IV and Elisabeth of Bavaria	1 November 1295 – 25 May 1310	County of Tyrol (with Duchy of Carinthia and March of Carniola)	Euphemia of Legnica; 1297 four children	25 May 1310 aged 44–45	Children of Meinhard IV/II, shared their inheritance. In 1307, Henry was elected King of Bohemia, but was deposed in 1310. The family lost Carniola and Carinthia after Henry's death. Only Tyrol passed to his daughter.
Henry (Note: Henry VI as duke of Carinthia.)	c.1270 Fourth son of Meinhard IV and Elisabeth of Bavaria	1 November 1295 – 2 April 1335	County of Tyrol (with Duchy of Carinthia and March of Carniola)	Anna of Bohemia; 1306 no children Adelaide of Brunswick-Grubenhagen; 1313 two children Beatrice of Savoy; 1327 no children	2 April 1335; Tyrol Castle aged 64–65	Children of Meinhard IV/II, shared their inheritance. In 1307, Henry was elected King of Bohemia, but was deposed in 1310. The family lost Carniola and Carinthia after Henry's death. Only Tyrol passed to his daughter.
Carinthia and Carniola merged into Habsburg domain
Henry III	1263; First son of Albert I and Euphemia of Glogow	1 April 1304 – 24 April 1323	County of Gorizia	Beatrice da Camino; 1297 one child Beatrice of Lower Bavaria; 1322 one child	24 April 1323; Görz aged 59–60	Children of Albert I, shared their rule. Henry III associated his eldest son, Meinhard, to the co-rulership.
Albert II	c.1265 Second son of Albert I and Euphemia of Glogow	1 April 1304 – 1327	County of Gorizia	Elisabeth of Hesse; 1299 five children Euphemia of Mätsch; 1321 three children	1327 aged 61–62	Children of Albert I, shared their rule. Henry III associated his eldest son, Meinhard, to the co-rulership.
Meinhard V	c.1300 First son of Henry III and Beatrice da Camino	c.1314 – 1320?	County of Gorizia	Unmarried	c.1320 aged 19–20	Children of Albert I, shared their rule. Henry III associated his eldest son, Meinhard, to the co-rulership.
1st Regency of Beatrice of Lower Bavaria (1323-1326); Regency of Albert II, Count of Gorizia (1326-1327); Regency of Henry, Count of Tyrol (1327-1335); 2nd Regency of Beatrice of Lower Bavaria (1335-1338)						Son of Henry III. Died childless, and was succeeded by his cousins, sons of his uncle Albert II.
(John) Henry IV	1322; Son of Henry III and Beatrice of Lower Bavaria	1327 – 17 March 1338	County of Gorizia	Anna of Austria c.1335 no children	17 March 1338 aged 15–16	Son of Henry III. Died childless, and was succeeded by his cousins, sons of his uncle Albert II.
Margaret	1318; Daughter of Henry and Adelaide of Brunswick-Grubenhagen	2 April 1335 – January 1363	County of Tyrol	John Henry of Luxembourg; 16 September 1330; Innsbruck (annulled 1349) no children Louis V, Duke of Bavaria; 10 February 1342; Merano two children	3 October 1369; Vienna aged 50–51	Shared rule with her husbands. In 1363, she abdicated from her domains, which were absorbed by the Habsburgs.
Tyrol annexed to the Habsburg domain
Albert III	c.1305 Son of Albert II and Elisabeth of Hesse	17 March 1338 – 1374	County of Gorizia (until 1365) Princely County of Gorizia (from 1365)	Helen no children Catherine of Celje; 1353 no children	1374 aged 70–71	Sons of Albert II, ruled jointly. At his death, Albert bequested his vast Istrian and Carniolan possessions to the Habsburg duke Rudolf IV of Austria. The remaining lands were kept by Meinhard VI, ascended as a Prince by Charles IV, Holy Roman Emperor
Meinhard VI	c.1325 First son of Albert II and Euphemia of Mätsch	17 March 1338 – May 1385	County of Gorizia (until 1365) Princely County of Gorizia (from 1365)	Catherine of Pfannberg three children Euphemia-Utehild of Mätsch three children	May 1385 aged 59–60	Sons of Albert II, ruled jointly. At his death, Albert bequested his vast Istrian and Carniolan possessions to the Habsburg duke Rudolf IV of Austria. The remaining lands were kept by Meinhard VI, ascended as a Prince by Charles IV, Holy Roman Emperor
Henry V	c.1325 Second son of Albert II and Euphemia of Mätsch	17 March 1338 – 1362	County of Gorizia (until 1365) Princely County of Gorizia (from 1365)	Gigliola da Carrara no children	1362 aged 36–37	Sons of Albert II, ruled jointly. At his death, Albert bequested his vast Istrian and Carniolan possessions to the Habsburg duke Rudolf IV of Austria. The remaining lands were kept by Meinhard VI, ascended as a Prince by Charles IV, Holy Roman Emperor
Henry VI	22 June 1376; First son of Meinhard VI and Euphemia-Utehild of Mätsch	May 1385 – 18 March 1454	Princely County of Gorizia (at Gorizia proper, with County of Kirchberg since 1430)	Elisabeth of Celje; 31 January 1400 two children Katalin Garai three children	18 March 1454 aged 77	Sons of Meinhard VI, ruled jointly.
(John) Meinhard VII	1378; Second son of Meinhard VI and Euphemia-Utehild of Mätsch	May 1385 – 22 May 1430	Princely County of Gorizia (at the County of Kirchberg)	Magdalena of Bavaria-Landshut; 1404 no children Agnes of Pettau-Wurmberg; 1422 no children	22 May 1430 aged 51–52	Sons of Meinhard VI, ruled jointly.
John II	1438; Lienz; First son of Henry VI and Katalin Garai	18 March 1454 – 22 May 1462	Princely County of Gorizia (with County of Kirchberg)	Unmarried	22 May 1462; Lienz aged 23–24	Sons of Henry VI, ruled jointly.
Leonard	1440; Lienz; Second son of Henry VI and Katalin Garai	18 March 1454 – 12 April 1500	Princely County of Gorizia (with County of Kirchberg)	Hieronyma of Ilok no children Paola Gonzaga; 1478 no children	12 April 1500; Lienz aged 59–60	Sons of Henry VI, ruled jointly.
Gorizia annexed to the Habsburg domain

== See also ==
- House of Gorizia
- History of Gorizia
- Austrian Empire
- History of Slovenia
