= Ceccaldi =

Ceccaldi (pronounced [tʃekˈkaldi]) is an Italian and Corsican surname derived from the medieval given name Ceccaldo. Notable people with the surname include:

- Charles Ceccaldi-Raynaud (1925–2019), French politician, father of Joëlle
- Daniel Ceccaldi (1927–2003), French actor
- Georges Colonna Ceccaldi (1840–1879/92), French antiquities dealer and diplomat
- Joëlle Ceccaldi-Raynaud (born 1951), French politician, daughter of Charles
- Marcantonio Ceccaldi (1521–1560), Corsican author, historian and politician
- Mathieu Ceccaldi (1893–1993), French Romance scholar, lexicographer and researcher of the Corsican language
- Pierre-Fernand Ceccaldi (1917–2006), French scientist and academic
- Théo Ceccaldi (born 1986), French composer, jazz violinist and viola player
- Valentin Ceccaldi (born 1989), French composer and jazz cello player

== See also ==
- Ceccardi, a surname
- Ceccardo, a given name
