= Gorizia Castle =

Medieval castle in Gorizia, Italy

- Castello di Gorizia
- Italy
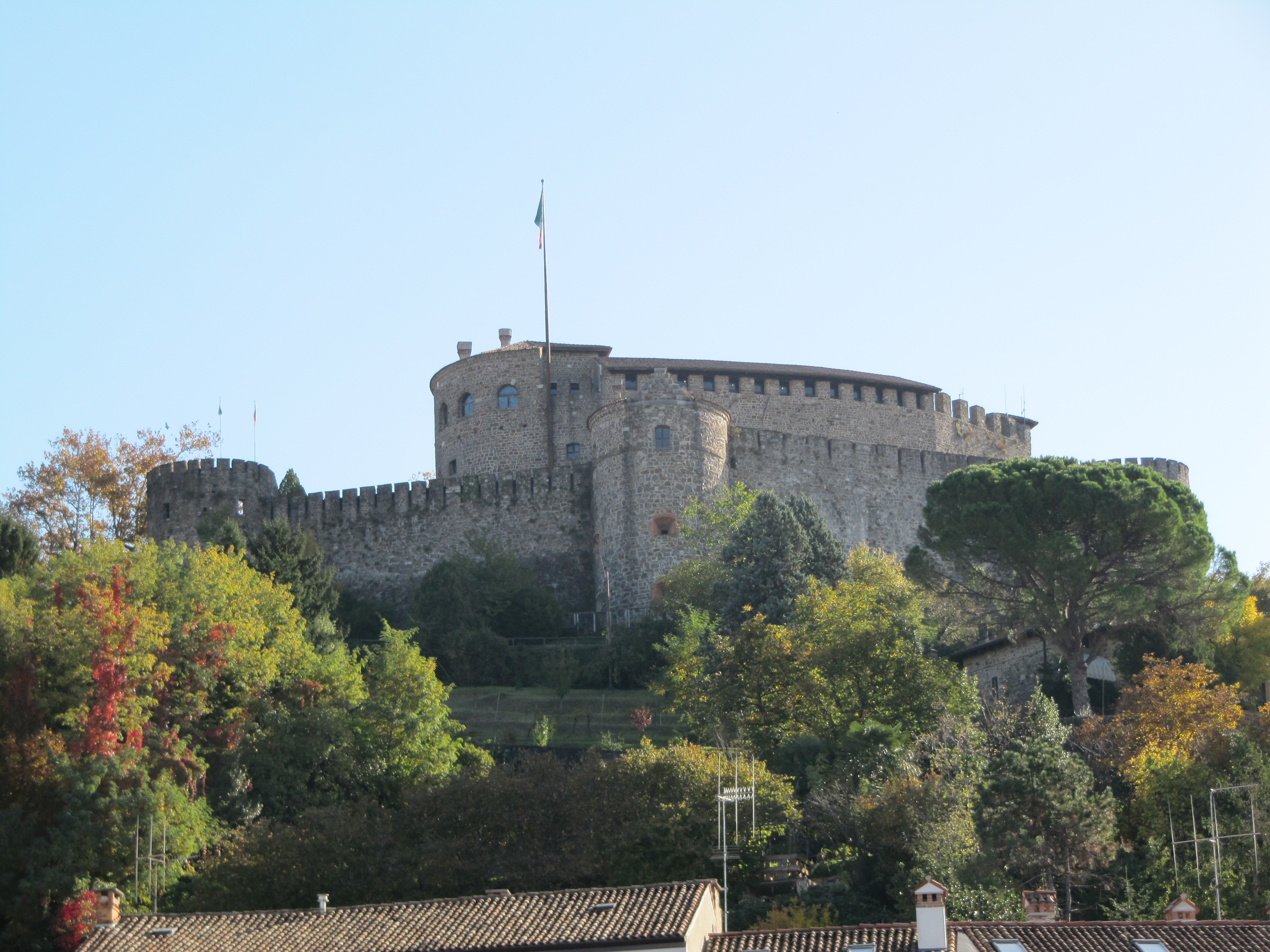
- Gorizia Castle

Site information
- Type: Medieval fortress
- Owner: Commune of Gorizia
- Open to the public: Yes

Location
- Coordinates: 45.9444°N 13.6278°E

Site history
- Built: 11th century

Gorizia Castle is an Italian fortification dating to the 11th century on the hill which dominates the city of Gorizia, Italy, from which it takes its name. The medieval House of Gorizia was named after the castle.

== History ==
The construction of Gorizia Castle can be dated to around 1146, where, for the first time, the title of Count of Gorizia appears, given to Henry IV of Spanheim, which presumes the presence of a fortification at the site. Already in the next generation, it passed to the counts in the Puster Valley, related to the Spanheims, who thereafter took the title of Counts of Gorizia, testifying to the importance of the castle at the time.

It is likely that an initial series of defensive structures such as a small motte-and-bailey fort with a moat and a palisade which had preceded the construction of a stone tower or keep, which was further expanded during the 13th century, with the addition of a mansion and a two-storey building. During the same period there was certainly a hamlet outside of the palisade, also outfitted with a defensive barrier and composed of houses mandatorily built in masonry, an enforcement given to the residents together with the duty of defending the castle in case of attack.

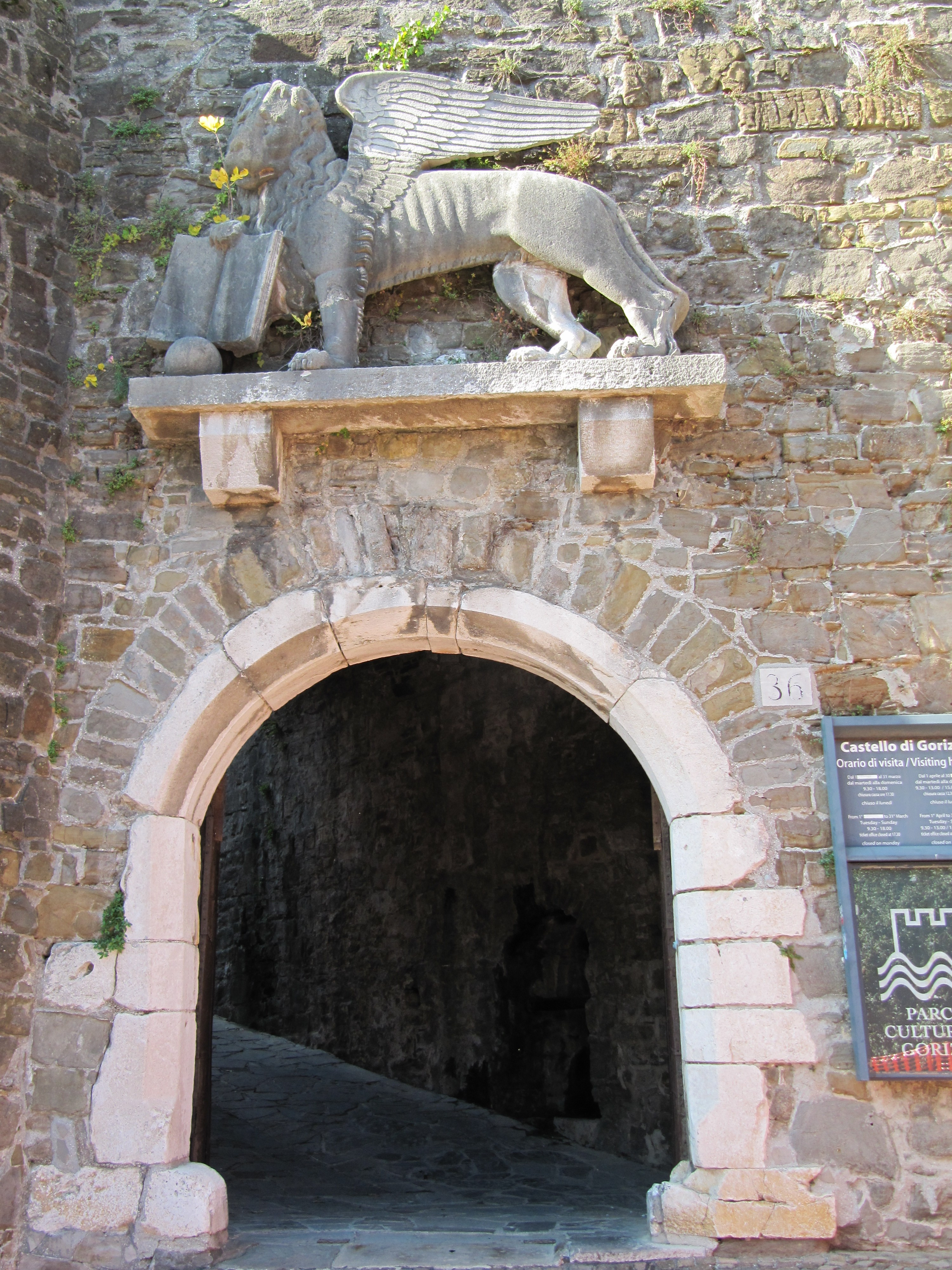
The castle's inner gate

The first representation of the castle dates back to 1307, imprinted on the seal allowed to the city by Albert II. Although the figure is very stylized, the keep can be clearly seen. It is likely that around 1350, the castle had similar appearance to that of Bruck in Lienz.

At Leonhard's death, the last count of Gorizia, in the spring of 1500, the County with Gorizia Castle became properties of Maximilian I of Habsburg, emperor of the Holy Roman Empire. Although having reinforced its defences, the castle and the region was lost in 1508, when it was seized by the Republic of Venice after Maximilian's unsuccessful attack on the Republic of Venice in the Battle of Cadore. The Republic claimed the County of Gorizia as an alleged fief of the Patriarchate of Aquileia.

Under the Republic of Venice, the castle had further fortification works to make it more appropriate to the Renaissance warfare, which incorporated the use of firearms. Among the various changes made, the 11th-century keep was demolished. However, Venice only managed to occupy the territory for thirteen months, until June 1509.

In the following century, the castle was used as a prison and as a barracks, and lost its medieval appearance. In the 13th century it was further expanded with bastions, powder kegs and walls. The construction of some of these works was supervised by mathematician and astronomer Edmond Halley.

The castle was damaged during the bombings in the First World War, and underwent a philological restoration between 1934 and 1937 by the architect Ferdinando Forlati, with the help of military engineers and the supervision of the Belle Arti of Trieste. It was decided to return to a medieval look of the castle and discard the white plastering that the building had acquired during the Renaissance.

== Today ==
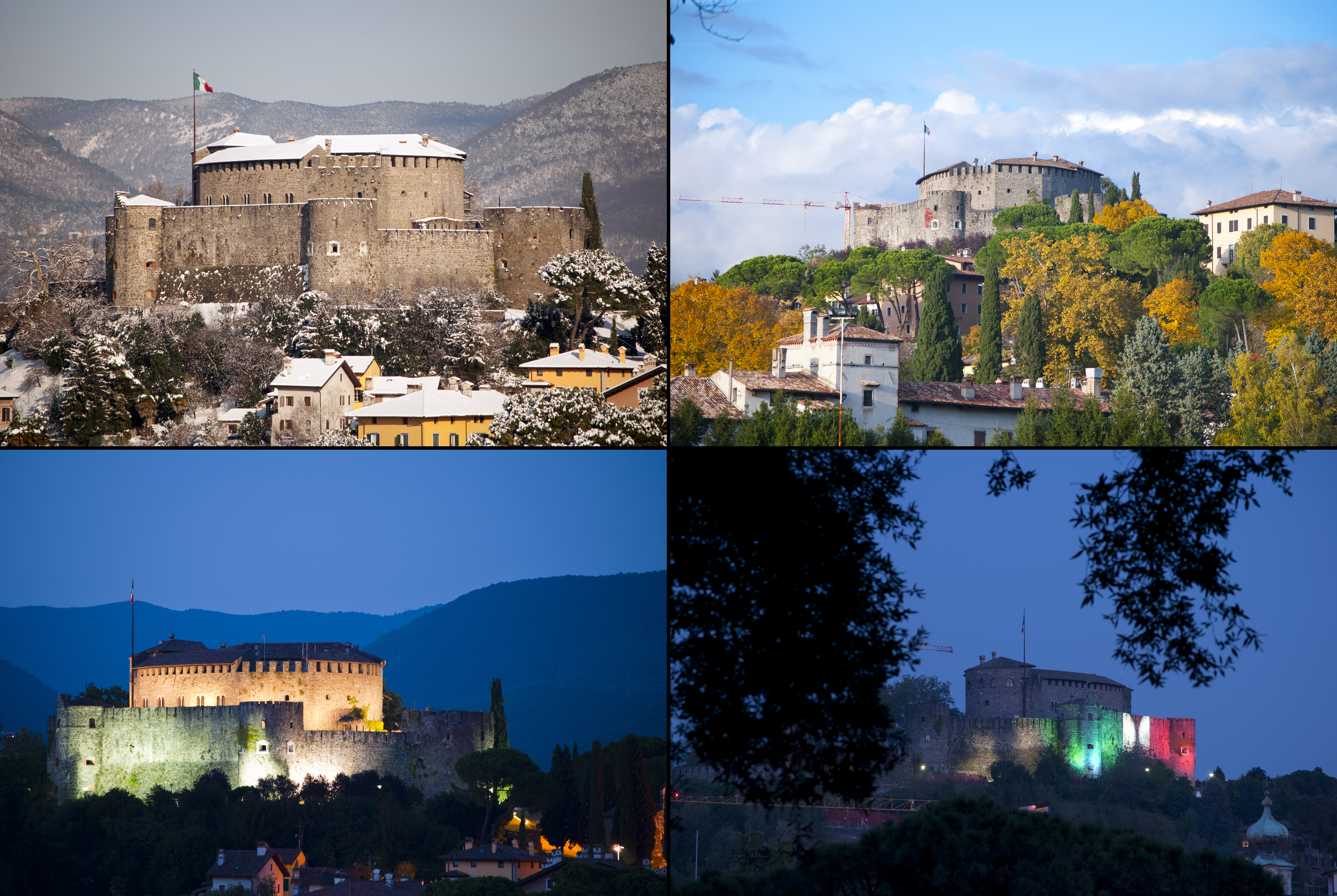
Views of the castle

The castle now houses the Museum of the Middle Ages of Gorizia. The interiors are decorated with original furniture and furnishings, and reproductions of weapons and siege engines are shown. In the central courtyard it is still possible to see the remains of the old 11th-century tower. Above the entrance there is a statue of the Lion of Saint Mark, symbol of the Republic of Venice. Although dating back to the 16th century, it was never used because of the brief Venetian domination, until 1919, when it was placed in its current location. On the hill around the castle there is a public park.

== Bibliography ==
- Lucia Pillon, Robero Kusterle, Gorizia Millenaria, Libreria Editrice Goriziana, 2005, ISBN 88-86928-96-3
- Maria Rosaria De Vitis Piemonti, Luciano Spangher, Conosciamo Gorizia, Pro Loco di Gorizia, 1987
- Livio Tomasi, La selezione dei beni culturali: il restauro del Castello di Gorizia, Cassa di Risparmio di Gorizia, 1985
- Maddalena Malni Pascoletti, La cittadella fortificata di Gorizia e la Porta Leopoldina tra guerra e arte, Italia Nostra - Sezione di Gorizia, 2008
