= Henry V of Gorizia =

Henry V, Count of Gorizia
- Died: 1362
- Noble family: Meinhardiner
- Spouse: Cigliola of Carrara
- Father: Albert II of Gorizia
- Mother: Euphemia of Mätsch

Henry V, Count of Gorizia (died 1362) was a Count of Gorizia from the Meinhardiner dynasty.

He was a son of Count Albert II and his second wife, Euphemia of Mätsch. In 1338, he and his (half-)brothers Meinhard VI and Albert III inherited the County of Gorizia, which they proceeded to rule jointly. In 1349, he was appointed captain of Friuli.

Henry V was married to Cigliola, daughter of Duke Jacopo of Carrara.

Henry V of Gorizia Meinhardiner Died: 1362
Preceded by John Henry IV	Count of Gorizia; 1338-1361; With: Meinhard VI and Albert III	Succeeded by Meinhard VI
