= Sieghart =

Sieghart or Sieghard (pronounced [ˈziːkhaʁt]), sometimes Sighard or Sieghardt, anglicized as Sigehard, is a German masculine given name and surname. Notable people with the name include:

== Given name ==
- Sigehard, Count in Luihgau and Hainaut (10th century)
- Sigehard (patriarch of Aquileia) (died 1077)
- Sieghard Brandenburg (1938–2015), German musicologist
- Sieghart Dittmann (born 1934), German chess player and epidemiologist
- Sieghart Döhring (born 1939), German musicologist
- Sighard F. Hoerner (1906–1971), German scientist
- Sieghard Knodel (born 1961), German politician
- Sieghardt Rupp (1931–2015), Austrian actor

== Surname ==
- Alexander Sieghart (born 1994), Thai footballer
- Ingomar Sieghart (born 1943), German athlete
- Mary Ann Sieghart (born 1961), English journalist, author and radio presenter
- William Sieghart (born 1960), British entrepreneur, publisher and philanthropist

== Fictional characters ==
- Sieghart, a major character in the video game Record of Agarest War Zero
- Sieghart Caesar, a character in the anime/manga Rave Master

== See also ==
- Sieghardinger, a medieval noble family of Bavaria
- Sigard, a variant of the name
- Siegert, a surname
- Ceccardo, the Italian equivalent of the name
