= Henry XV of Bavaria =

14th-century Bavarian nobleman

Henry XV

Duke of Lower Bavaria
- Reign: 1312–18 June 1333
- Predecessor: Otto III, Duke of Bavaria
- Successor: Henry XIV, Duke of Bavaria and Otto IV, Duke of Lower Bavaria
- Born: 28 August 1300
- Died: 18 June 1333 (aged 32); Natternberg, near Deggendorf
- Spouse: Anne of Austria, Duchess of Bavaria
- House: Wittelsbach
- Father: Otto III, Duke of Bavaria
- Mother: Agnes of Głogów

Henry XV, Duke of Bavaria, as duke of Lower Bavaria also called Henry III, (28 August 1312 – 18 June 1333 in Natternberg near Deggendorf).

== Biography ==
Henry was a son of Otto III, Duke of Bavaria and Agnes of Głogów (born 1293-96 – died 25 December 1361). He was called the Natternberger for his favourite residence Natternberg castle. He was born in the year of his father's death and first under tutelage of Louis IV, Holy Roman Emperor. Henry XV ruled then parts of Lower Bavaria with Deggendorf as capital after a conflict with his cousins and co-regents Henry XIV and Otto IV. His candidacy for the Hungarian crown in 1327 was not successful.

== Marriage ==
Between 1326 and 1328, Henry XV married Anna of Austria. She was a daughter of Frederick I of Austria and Isabella of Aragon. They had no children. She survived him by ten years and went on to marry John Henry IV of Gorizia.

Henry XV of Bavaria House of Wittelsbach Born: 1312 Died: 1333
Regnal titles
Preceded by Otto III	Duke of Lower Bavaria; 1312–1333	Succeeded by Henry XIV and Otto IV
