= Treaty of Ulm =

Treaty of Ulm can refer to one of several treaties signed in Ulm, Germany:

- Treaty of Ulm (1326), establishing the joint rule of Frederick the Fair and Louis IV, Holy Roman Emperor in the Holy Roman Empire
- Treaty of Ulm (1620), under which the Protestant Union established its neutrality in the conflict between Frederick V of the Palatinate and the Catholic League
- Truce of Ulm (1647), establishing a truce between France, Sweden, and Bavaria during the Thirty Years' War
