= Siegert =

Siegert (pronounced [ˈziːɡɐt]) is a German surname derived from the given name Sieghart. Notable people with the name include:

- Andrew Siegert (born 1982), Australian footballer
- Benjamin Siegert (born 1981), German footballer
- Bernhard Siegert (born 1959), German media theorist and media historian
- Daniel Siegert (born 1991), German singer
- Ferdinand Siegert (1865–1946), German paediatrician
- Hans Siegert (1914–1966), East German footballer and manager
- Herb Siegert (1924–2008), American footballer
- Herbert Siegert (1920–2008), German football manager
- Larry Siegert (1923–2007), Royal New Zealand Air Force officer
- Martin Siegert, British geographer
- Tobias Siegert (born 1991), German Grand Prix motorcycle racer

== See also ==
- Bloch–Siegert shift
