= Isabella of Aragon, Queen of Germany =

Queen of Germany from 1315 to 1330

Isabella of Aragon
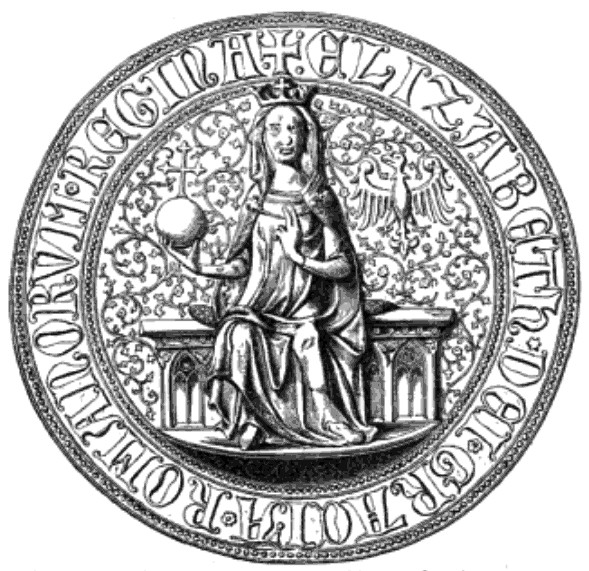
- Isabella's seal as queen

Queen consort of Germany Duchess consort of Austria
- Tenure: 11 May 1315 – 13 January 1330
- Coronation: 1315 (Basel)
- Born: 1300
- Died: 12 July 1330 (aged 29–30)
- Burial: Vienna, Austria
- Spouse: Frederick the Fair
- Issue: Anna, Duchess of Bavaria; Frederick of Austria; Elisabeth of Austria
- House: Barcelona
- Father: James II of Aragon
- Mother: Blanche of Anjou

Isabella of Aragon (1300 – 12 July 1330) was the daughter of James II of Aragon and his second wife Blanche of Anjou. The queen consort of Frederick I of Austria, she was a member of the House of Barcelona.

== Life ==
Isabella was originally betrothed to Oshin of Armenia, son of Leo II, King of Armenia. Her father planned her betrothal to Oshin in exchange for religious relics of St Thecla, located at Sis in Armenia, which he was anxious to acquire for the cathedral of Tarragona. Negotiations for the marriage broke down in the face of Armenian opposition to increased close ties with the Catholic western powers.

On 11 May 1315, Isabella married Frederick I of Austria, king of Germany, in Ravensburg. From then onwards, Isabella was known as Elisabeth in Germany and Austria. Her husband had been elected as one of two rival kings of Germany in October, 1314. His rival was Louis IV of Bavaria. With her marriage, Isabel became one of two Queens of Germany with Beatrice of Silesia, wife of Louis IV. On 5 September 1325, Frederick I and Louis IV resolved their conflict by agreeing to serve as co-rulers. However Frederick soon became the junior co-ruler and retired to Austria until his death on 13 January 1330.

It is said that Isabella was blind in the last six years of her life. She was buried at the Minoritenkirche in Vienna.

== Marriage and issue ==
Isabel and Frederick had at least three children:

- Frederick of Austria (1316–1322).
- Elisabeth of Austria (1317 – 23 October 1336).
- Anna of Austria (1318 – 14 December 1343). Married first Henry XV, Duke of Bavaria and secondly John Henry, Count of Gorizia.

Royal titles
Preceded by Margaret of Brabant	German Queen; 11 May 1315 – 13 January 1330; With Beatrix von Silesia-Glogau (1315–1322) and Margaret II of Hainaut (1324–1330)	Succeeded by Margaret II of Hainaut
