= Friedrich of Germany =

Friedrich of Germany or Frederick of Germany may refer to:

- Frederick I, Holy Roman Emperor (1122–1190), or Frederick I Barbarossa, king of Germany
- Frederick II, Holy Roman Emperor, (1194–1250), king of Jerusalem and Sicily
- Frederick the Fair (1289–1330), or Frederick I of Austria and Frederick III of Germany
- Frederick III, Holy Roman Emperor (1415–1493), king of Germany
- Frederick III, German Emperor, (1831–1888), German emperor, king of Prussia
