= Meinhard VI of Gorizia =

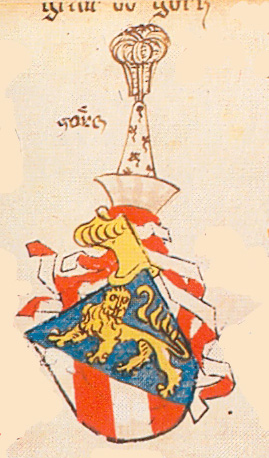
- Coat of arms of the Albertine line of the Counts of Gorizia, from the Ingeram Codex, 1459
- Born: before 1327
- Died: after 6 May 1385
- Noble family: Meinhardiner
- Spouses: Catherine of Pfannberg; Utehild of Mätsch
- Issue: Henry VI, Count of Gorizia; John Meinhard VII, Count of Gorizia
- Father: Albert II of Gorizia
- Mother: Euphemia of Mätsch

Meinhard VI of Gorizia (died after 6 May 1385) a member of the Meinhardiner dynasty, an imperial prince and a count of Gorizia.

== Life ==
His parents were Count Albert II of Gorizia and Euphemia of Mätsch. From 1338 to 1365, he ruled Gorizia jointly with his brothers Albert III and Henry V, after inheriting the county from their uncle John Henry IV. From 1362 when Henry V of Gorizia died, he ruled alongside Albert III. From 1365, Meinhard VI ruled Gorizia alone. He failed in a claim over the County of Tyrol when his second cousin Margaret was forced to cede Tyrol to Rudolf IV, Duke of Austria, in 1363. This ended the "dominium Tyrolis" which had existed since 1254.

He managed to reduce the power of the Patriarchate of Aquileia, however, the Republic of Venice became the beneficiary of the Patriarchate, which led to sharp contrasts between the parties involved. Meinhard retreated from Gorizia Castle to Burg Bruck (Schloss Bruck) in Lienz.

Meinhard's reign marked the beginning of the decline of the County of Gorizia. The princes of Gorizia had to mortgage and sell more and more of their possessions to salvage their worsening financial position. Meinhard was involved in power struggles with his ecclesiastical neighbours, and in disputes with the Habsburg dynasty about the succession in the Duchy of Carinthia and the County of Tyrol.

== Marriages and issue ==
Meinhard's first marriage was with Catherine, the daughter of Count Ulrich V of Pfannberg. After her death, he married Utehild, the daughter of Vogt Ulrich IV of Mätsch.

He had the following children:

- Anna of Zwarscheneck (d. 1402), married to Count Johann Frankopan of Veglia, Ban of Croatia (d. 1393)
- Catherine of Gorizia (d. 1391), married to Duke John II of Bavaria-Munich (d. 1397)
- Ursula of Schoeneck, Neuhaus and Uttenstein, married to Count Henry III of Schauberg (d. 1390)
- Elisabeth, betrothed to William, Count of Celje, died before marriage
- Henry VI of Gorizia (1376–1454)
- John Meinhard VII, Count Palatine of Carinthia, Count of Kirchberg (d. 1430), married:
  1. Magdalena, a daughter of the Duke Frederick "the Wise" of Bavaria
  2. Agnes of Pettau-Wurmberg

Meinhard VI of Gorizia Meinhardiner Died: after 6 May 1385
Preceded by John Henry IV	Count of Gorizia; 1338-1385; With: Albert III and Henry V (until 1365)	Succeeded by Henry VI
