= Ceccardo =

Ceccardo (pronounced [tʃekˈkardo]) is a rare Italian masculine given name of Germanic origin, most likely equivalent to German Sieghart. Notable people with the name include:

- Ceccardus of Luni or Ceccardo (died 860), Italian Roman Catholic bishop and saint
- Ceccardo Egidio Fucigna (1834–1884), Italian sculptor

== See also ==
- Ceccardi, a surname
- Ceccaldi, a surname
