= Albert III of Gorizia =

Albert III
- Count of Gorizia
- Born: before 1308
- Died: 1374
- Noble family: Meinhardiner
- Spouses: Helen; Catherine of Celje
- Father: Albert II of Gorizia
- Mother: Elisabeth of Hesse

Albert III (died in 1374), a member of the House of Gorizia (Meinhardiner dynasty), ruled as Count of Gorizia from 1338 until his death.

== Life ==
Albert III was a son of Count Albert II of Gorizia (1261–1325) and his first wife Elizabeth, a daughter of Landgrave Henry I of Hesse. From 1329 to 1338, he served as governor of Gorizia, Friuli, and Istria for his minor nephew Count John Henry IV.

In 1338, he inherited the County of Gorizia (Görz) upon the early death of John Henry IV. Albert ruled jointly with his younger half-brothers Henry V and Meinhard VI. In 1339, they agreed that Albert would be the sole count palatine of Carinthia. Three years later, he waived his rights to Gorizia and went on to rule in Istria (Mitterburg) and in the Windic March, including County of Metlika.

Albert III married a noblewoman named Helen and later, in 1353, with Catherine, a daughter of Count Frederick I of Celje. Both marriages were childless. Shortly before his death about 1374, Albert bequested his vast Istrian and Carniolan possessions to the Habsburg duke Rudolf IV of Austria. The remaining Gorizia estates were inherited by his surviving half-brother Meinhard VI, who was elevated to a Prince of the Holy Roman Empire by Emperor Charles IV.

Albert III of Gorizia House of Gorizia (Meinhardiner) Died: c. 1365
Preceded by John Henry IV	Count of Gorizia; 1338–1365; With: Henry V and Meinhard VI	Succeeded by Meinhard VI
