= Henry III of Gorizia =

Henry III, Count of Gorizia
- Born: 1263
- Died: 1323 (aged 59–60); Treviso
- Noble family: Meinhardiner
- Spouses: Beatrix da Camino; Beatrix of Lower Bavaria
- Issue: Meinhard V John Henry IV of Gorizia
- Father: Albert I of Gorizia
- Mother: Euphemia of Silesia-Głogów

Henry III, Count of Gorizia (c. 1263–1323) was a member of the Meinhardiner dynasty.

== Biography ==
He was the son of Count Albert I of Gorizia and his wife, Euphemia of Silesia-Głogów. In 1295-1299 he accompanied the father in his invasion of Istria against the patriarchate of Aquileia, conquering Plomin, Labin, Buzet and Tolmin, although the arrival of a large patriarchal army of the forced them to return.

He succeeded his father as Count of Gorizia in 1304, inheriting the fiefs in Friuli, Istria, Carniola and Carinthia, while his brother Albert II received only the Puster Valley.

During the feudal wars that marked the initial reign of Ottobuono di Razzi as patriarch of Aquileia, Henry was initially allied with Rizzardo IV da Camino. The two conquered several castles and strongholds, including that of Spilimbergo. However, in 1310 Henry changed side, receiving the position of general captain of the patriarchate and pushing back the Treviso troops from Friuli. He was also named podestà of Trieste in 1311.

== Marriage and issue ==
He first married in 1297 to Beatrix da Camino, daughter of Gerard. With her, he had one son, Meinhard V.

In 1322, Henry III married his second wife, Beatrix of Lower Bavaria, the daughter of Stephen I, Duke of Bavaria (1271–1310). With her, he had another son, John Henry IV (1322–1338)

== Ancestry ==
Ancestors of Henry III of Gorizia

16. Engelbert II, Count of Gorizia
8. Engelbert III, Count of Gorizia
17. Adelaide of Scheyern-Dachau-Valley
4. Meinhard I, Count of Gorizia-Tyrol
18. Berthold I of Istria
9. Matilda of Andechs
19. Hedwig of Wittelsbach
2. Albert I of Gorizia
20. Henry I, Count of Tyrol
10. Albert IV, Count of Tyrol
21. Agnes of Wangen
5. Adelaide of Tyrol
22. Henry II of Frontenhausen-Lechsgemünd
11. Uta of Frontenhausen-Lechsgemünd
23. Adelaid of Plain
1. Henry III, Count of Gorizia
24. Henry the Bearded
12. Henry II the Pious
25. Saint Hedwig of Silesia
6. Konrad I, Duke of Głogów
26. Ottokar I of Bohemia
13. Anne of Bohemia
27. Constance of Hungary
3. Euphemia of Głogów
28. Henry III, Margrave of Meissen
14. Theodoric of Landsberg
29. Constance of Austria
7. Sophie of Landsberg
30. John I, Margrave of Brandenburg
15. Helena of Brandenburg
31. Sophie of Denmark

Henry III of Gorizia Meinhardiner Born: 1263 Died: 1323
Preceded by Albert I	Count of Gorizia; 1304-1323	Succeeded by John Henry IV
