= Sigard =

Sigard is a variant of the German masculine given name Sieghart. Notable people with the name include:

- Sigard, Count in Luihgau and Hainaut (10th century)
- Sigard Adolphus Knopf (1857–1940), German-American physician
