= John Henry IV of Gorizia =

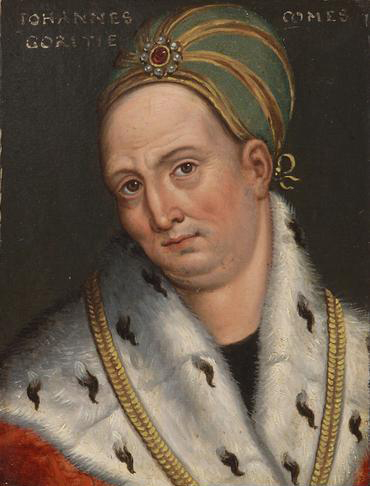
- John Henry IV of Gorizia by Anton Boys
- Born: 1322 or 1323
- Died: 17 March 1338
- Buried: Rosazzo Abbey
- Noble family: Meinhardiner
- Spouse: Anna of Habsburg
- Father: Henry III, Count of Gorizia
- Mother: Beatrix of Lower Bavaria

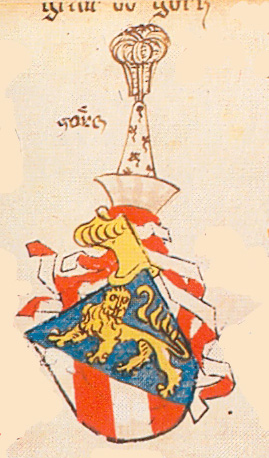
Coat of arms of the Albertine line of the Counts of Gorizia, in the Ingeram Codex, 1459

John Henry IV of Gorizia (1322–1338) was a medieval Count of Gorizia and a member of the Meinhardiner dynasty. He was the only surviving son of Henry III and his wife Beatrix of Lower Bavaria, the daughter of Duke Stephen I. He succeeded his father as Count of Gorizia in 1323. Because he was still a minor, his mother and his uncles Albert II of Gorizia and later Henry of Carinthia acted as regents. After 1329, the custody was taken over by his cousin Albert III. Since he died young, he never actually reigned himself. Nevertheless, in 1332, aged nine, he was elected as podesta of Trieste, in the city's attempt to forge an alliance with Gorizia against Venetian expansion.

In 1335, he was betrothed to Beatrice of Sicily, daughter of Elizabeth of Carinthia, Queen of Sicily. Elizabeth renounced her rights to Tyrol and Carinthia on Beatrice's behalf, but the betrothal was cancelled by John Henry's mother who decided to settle with the new Habsburg rulers of Carinthia. In 1335, with a treaty signed in Ljubljana, John Henry thus betrothed to Anna of Habsburg, the daughter of the anti-king Frederick the Fair, who was a second cousin in his mother. The two married soon thereafter but the marriage remained childless.

Since he died childless, he was succeeded by the sons of his uncle Albert II. They were Meinhard VI (until 1385), Albert III (until 1374) and Henry V (until 1362).

He was buried in the abbey in Rosazzo in Friuli.

John Henry IV of Gorizia Meinhardiner Born: 1322 Died: 1338
Preceded by Henry III	Count of Gorizia; 1323-1338	Succeeded by Meinhard VI, Albert III and Henry V
