= Albert I of Gorizia =

Albert I
- Count of Gorizia
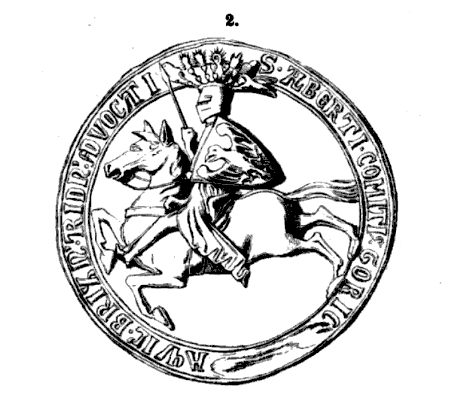
- Born: c. 1240
- Died: 1 April 1304
- Noble family: House of Gorizia (Meinhardiner)
- Spouses: Euphemia of Głogów; Euphemia of Ortenburg
- Issue: Henry III, Count of Gorizia; Albert II of Gorizia
- Father: Meinhard I, Count of Gorizia-Tyrol
- Mother: Adelaide of Tyrol

Albert I (c. 1240 – 1 April 1304), a member of the House of Gorizia (Meinhardiner dynasty), ruled the counties of Gorizia (Görz) and Tyrol from 1258, jointly with his elder brother Meinhard IV. In 1271, the brothers divided their heritage and Albert became sole ruler of the Gorizia estates until his death. His descendants, known collectively as the Albertine line, ruled the County of Gorizia until the extinction of the House in 1500.

Coat-of-arms of the count of Gorizia.

== Biography ==
Albert was the younger son of Count Meinhard III of Gorizia, who had married Adelaide, daughter of Count Albert IV of Tyrol. As his father-in-law left no male heirs when he died in 1253, Count Meinhard III was able to unite the Gorizia and Tyrolean lands under his rule.

Reigning as Meinhard I of Gorizia-Tyrol, Albert's father, however, also had entered a fierce quarrel with the Sponheim duke Bernhard of Carinthia and his son, Archbishop-elect Philip of Salzburg. Defeated by the united Carinthian and Salzburg forces, Meinhard's sons, young Albert and his elder brother Meinhard IV, from 1253 were held hostage by the Salzburg archbishop at Hohenwerfen Castle. Count Meinhard died in 1258; his sons, finally released in 1262, went on to rule their Gorizia-Tyrol heritage. In 1267 Albert participated in an expedition against the advancing Venice forces in the March of Istria alongside the Aquileia patriarch Gregorio di Montelongo, but later had him kidnapped sparking a long-time conflict.

In 1271, after a lengthy inheritance dispute, Albert finally split his father's heirloom of Gorizia-Tyrol with his elder brother Meinhard. He received the County of Gorizia, i.e. the family's estates around Gorizia in the former March of Friuli, in Istria and Carniola, as well as in the Tyrolean Puster Valley up to Lienz, while Meinhard went on to rule as Count of Tyrol. While the Tyrolean branch of the Meinhardiner dynasty became extinct in the male line upon the death of Meinhard's son Henry in 1335, Albert's descendants ruled Gorizia until the death of Count Leonhard in 1500.

In the war for Capodistria (1274-1279), Albert again sided for Patriarch Raimondo della Torre against Venice, receiving the fortress of Cormons in exchange. When in 1275 the armed conflict of King Ottokar II of Bohemia against the newly elected Habsburg king Rudolf I of Germany broke out, Albert invaded Ottokar's lands in Carniola and the Windic March, while his brother Meinhard occupied Carinthia; later they both invaded the Duchy of Styria (1276). The conflict ended with confiscation of Ottokar's possessions by King Rudolf, although the war later resumed, ending with the death of Ottokar in the 1278 Battle on the Marchfeld. In reward of their support, Albert's brother Meinhard was enfeoffed with the Duchy of Carinthia in 1286.

In 1283 Albert and Patriarch Raimondo were again allied against Venice, this time in the war for Trieste; however, in 1289, after an unsuccessful attack against the Romagna fort in April 1289, he signed a separate peace with the Venetians.

== Marriage and issue ==
Albert married Euphemia, daughter of the Piast duke Konrad I of Głogów and after her death in 1275 Countess Euphemia of Ortenburg. He had two sons: Henry III, born 1263, who succeeded him as Count of Gorizia from 1304 to 1323; and Albert II, Count of Gorizia from 1323 to 1325. His daughter was Clara Euphemia, who was betrothed to Andrew the Venetian (future king of Hungary) in 1286. Later she became the wife of Croatian lord John Babonić.

Albert died in 1304, his lands going mostly to Henry III, while Albert II received only the lands in the Puster Valley.

Albert I of Gorizia House of Gorizia Born: c. 1240 Died: 1 April 1304
Preceded by Meinhard I	Count of Gorizia; 1258–1304 with Meinhard II (1258–1271)	Succeeded by Henry III
Preceded by Meinhard I	Count of Tyrol; 1258–1271 with Meinhard II	Succeeded by Meinhard II
