= Frederick the Fair =

King of Germany from 1314 to 1330

- Frederick's effigy on his seal

King of the Romans with Louis IV
- Reign: 19 October 1314 – 13 January 1330
- Coronation: 25 November 1314 (Bonn)
- Predecessor: Henry VII
- Successor: Louis IV

Duke of Austria and Styria until 1326 with Leopold I
- Reign: 1 May 1308 – 13 January 1330
- Predecessor: Albert I
- Successor: Albert II; Otto the Merry
- Born: 1289; Vienna, Duchy of Austria, Holy Roman Empire
- Died: 13 January 1330 (aged 40–41); Gutenstein, Duchy of Austria, Holy Roman Empire
- Burial: Mauerbach Charterhouse (1330–1782); Ducal Crypt, Vienna (since 1782)
- Spouse: Isabella of Aragon
- Issue: Anna, Duchess of Bavaria
- House: House of Habsburg
- Father: Albert I of Germany
- Mother: Elizabeth of Carinthia

Frederick the Fair (German: Friedrich der Schöne) or the Handsome (c. 1289 – 13 January 1330), from the House of Habsburg, was the duke of Austria and Styria from 1308 as well as the anti-king of Germany from 1314 until 1325 and then co-king until his death.

== Background ==
Frederick was born in Vienna, the second son of King Albert I of Germany and his wife Elisabeth of Gorizia-Tyrol, a scion of the Meinhardiner dynasty, and thereby a grandson of the first Habsburg king of Germany Rudolph I.

== Duke of Austria ==
Still a minor, he and his elder brother Rudolph III had been vested with the duchies of Austria and Styria by their father in 1298. Upon Rudolph's early death in 1307 and the assassination of his father in 1308, he became the ruler of the Austrian and Styrian duchies on behalf of himself and his younger brothers. The royal title held by his father and grandfather however passed to Count Henry VII of Luxembourg, who was elected by six of seven votes, contrived by the mighty Archchancellor Peter of Aspelt, elector and prince-archbishop of Mainz, a fierce opponent of late King Albert. Frederick had to abjure all claims to the German crown and in turn received the official affirmation of his fiefs by King Henry.

Originally, he was a friend of his cousin Louis IV of Bavaria, who also had been raised at the Austrian court in Vienna. However, armed conflict arose between them when tutelage over the young sons of Louis' cousin, late Duke Stephen I of Lower Bavaria was entrusted to Frederick by local nobles in 1313. Frederick took the occasion to enlarge his reach of power, invaded the Bavarian lands, but was beaten by Louis at the Battle of Gammelsdorf on 9 November 1313, and had to renounce the tutelage.

== Double election of 1314 ==
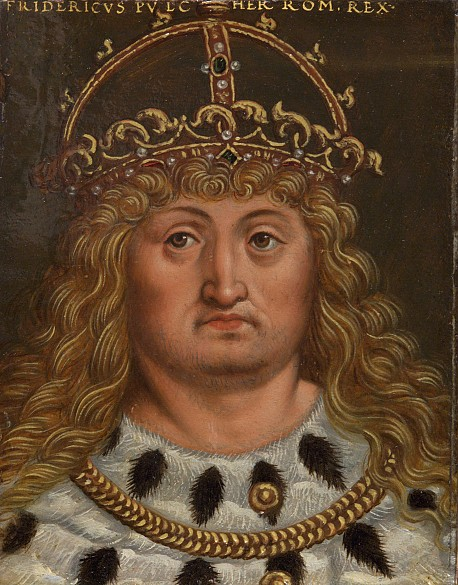
Frederick III the Fair

Meanwhile, Henry VII had been crowned emperor by Pope Clement V on 29 June 1312, but he died in the following year. As his son King John of Bohemia, seemed too powerful to the prince-electors, Frederick again became a candidate for the crown, while King John withdrew and backed Louis IV of Bavaria. On 19 October 1314 at Frankfurt-Sachsenhausen, Frederick received four out of seven votes, however two of them being contested, by Archbishop Henry II of Cologne, by Louis' brother Elector Palatine Rudolph I who did not want to support his younger brother, by the deposed Bohemian king Henry of Carinthia, and Duke Rudolph I of Saxe-Wittenberg (whose right was contested by his Lauenburg cousin, head of the senior branch). The next day however (because the Luxemburg party did not accept this election), a second election was held upon the instigation of Archbishop Peter von Aspelt, where Louis IV was elected with the five votes by the Mainz archbishop himself, by Archbishop Baldwin of Trier, Margrave Waldemar of Brandenburg as well as by Duke John II of Saxe-Lauenburg (he contested his Wittenberg cousin's claim to the electoral vote) and – again – the king of Bohemia, John. It is clear that at least three of the voters of Louis were uncontested electors.

Louis made use of the conflict around the Bohemian throne and the rivalry over the Saxon electoral dignity between the Ascanian duchies of Saxe-Wittenberg and Saxe-Lauenburg. Henry of Carinthia voting for Frederick actually only claimed the electoral power, as he had already been deposed in 1310 by John voting for Louis. Duke John II of Saxe-Lauenburg in turn sought to prevail against his cousin Duke Rudolph I of Saxe-Wittenberg – which ultimately failed as the 1338 Declaration of Rhense and the Golden Bull of 1356 conclusively named the dukes of Saxe-Wittenberg as electors.

Louis then was quickly crowned at Aachen Cathedral by Archbishop Peter von Aspelt, while Frederick was forced to proceed to Bonn Minster for his coronation on 25 November 1314 by the Cologne archbishop Heinrich von Virneburg. Both tried for the support by the Imperial States; Frederick was enfeebled by the fact that he had been crowned at the wrong place and moreover struggled with the rebellious Swiss Confederacy in the Swabian home territories of the Habsburgs, suffering a crushing defeat at the 1315 Battle of Morgarten. He nevertheless was able to hold his ground against the Wittelsbach rival and after several years of bloody war, victory finally seemed to be within Frederick's grasp, as he was strongly supported by the forces of his younger brother Leopold I. However, Frederick's army was in the end completely beaten near Mühldorf on Ampfing Heath on 28 September 1322, and Frederick and 1,300 nobles from Austria and the allied Archbishopric of Salzburg were captured.

== Reconciliation ==
Louis held Frederick captive at Trausnitz Castle in the Upper Palatinate for three years, but the persistent resistance by Frederick's brother Leopold, the retreat of King John of Bohemia from his alliance and a ban by Pope John XXII induced Louis to release him under the Treaty of Trausnitz of 13 March 1325. In this agreement, Frederick finally recognized Louis as legitimate ruler and undertook to return to captivity if he did not succeed in convincing his younger brothers to submit to Louis. As he did not manage to overcome Leopold's obstinacy, Frederick returned to Munich as a prisoner, even though the Pope had released him from his oath. Impressed by Frederick's noble gesture, Louis renewed the old friendship with Frederick and they agreed to rule the Holy Roman Empire jointly. Since the Pope and the prince-electors strongly objected to this agreement, another treaty was signed at Ulm on 7 January 1326, according to which Frederick would govern Germany as king, while Louis would be crowned emperor by the "people of Rome" under Sciarra Colonna in 1328.

After Leopold's death in 1326, Frederick withdrew from ruling Germany and returned to rule only in Austria and Styria. He died on 13 January 1330, at Gutenstein Castle in the Wienerwald range, and was buried at Mauerbach Charterhouse, which he had founded. After the charterhouse was closed down in 1782, his remains were brought to the Ducal Crypt at St. Stephen's Cathedral in Vienna.

Frederick's gracious return to captivity inspired Friedrich Schiller to write his poem Deutsche Treue ("German Loyalty") and Uhland to his tragedy Ludwig der Bayer ("Louis the Bavarian").

== Marriage and issue ==
On 11 May 1315 Frederick had married Isabella of Aragon, daughter of King James II of Aragon with Blanche of Anjou, an ambitious woman with an immense dowry. They had one son, who was born in 1316 but he died in 1322.

Their daughters:

- Elizabeth was born in 1317 and she died in 1336.
- Anna was born in 1318, and married the Wittelsbach duke Henry XV of Bavaria in 1328. The marriage was childless. Henry died in 1333. Her second husband was Count John Henry IV of Gorizia. This marriage was also childless and John died in 1338. Anne died in 1343.

Frederick was succeeded in Austria and Styria by his younger brothers Albert II and Otto. It took the Habsburgs more than a century to regain the royal crown, when Albert's II great-grandson Albert V of Austria ascended to the German throne in 1438.

== Male-line family tree ==
House of Habsburg

Original line
Albert; Count of Habsburg c. 1188–1239
Rudolf I of Germany c. 1218–1291
Albert I of Germany; 1255–1308	Hartmann; 1263–1281	Rudolf II; Duke of Austria; 1270–1290
Rudolf I of Bohemia; 1281–1307	Frederick the Fair c. 1289–1330	Leopold I Duke of Austria; 1290–1326	Albert II; Duke of Austria; 1298–1358	Henry the Friendly; 1299–1327	Otto; Duke of Austria; 1301–1339	John; Parricida c. 1290–1312/1313
Albertinian line	Leopoldian line
Rudolf IV; Duke of Austria; 1339–1365	Frederick III; 1347–1362	Albert III; Duke of Austria; 1349–1395	Leopold III; Duke of Austria; 1351–1386	Frederick II; Duke of Austria; 1327–1344	Leopold II; Duke of Austria; 1328–1344
Albert IV; Duke of Austria; 1377–1404	William; Duke of Austria c. 1370–1406	Leopold IV; Duke of Austria; 1371–1411	Ernest; Duke of Austria; 1377–1424	Frederick IV; Duke of Austria; 1382–1439
Albert II of Germany; 1397–1439	Frederick III; HRE; 1415–1493	Albert VI; Archduke of Austria; 1418–1463	Sigismund; Archduke of Austria; 1427–1496
Ladislaus the Posthumous; 1440–1457	Maximilian I HRE; 1459–1519
Philip I of Castile; 1478–1506
Spanish / Iberian line	Austrian / HRE line
Charles V HRE; 1500–1558	Ferdinand I HRE; 1503–1564
Philip II of Spain; 1527–1598	Maximilian II; HRE; 1527–1576	Ferdinand II; Archduke of Austria; 1529–1595	Charles II; Archduke of Austria; 1540–1590
Carlos; Prince of Asturias; 1545–1568	Philip III of Spain; 1578–1621	Rudolf II; HRE; 1552–1612	Ernest of Austria; 1553–1595	Matthias; HRE; 1557–1619	Maximilian III; Archduke of Austria; 1558–1618	Albert VII; Archduke of Austria; 1559–1621	Wenceslaus; Archduke of Austria; 1561–1578	Andrew; Margrave of Burgau; 1558–1600	Charles; Margrave of Burgau; 1560–1618	Ferdinand II; HRE; 1578–1637	Maximilian Ernest of Austria; 1583–1616	Leopold V Archduke of Austria; 1586–1632	Charles of Austria; 1590–1624
Philip IV of Spain; 1605–1665	Charles of Austria; 1607–1632	Ferdinand of Austria; 1609–1641	John-Charles of Austria; 1605–1619	Ferdinand III; HRE; 1608–1657	Leopold Wilhelm of Austria; 1614–1662	Ferdinand Charles; Archduke of Austria; 1628–1662	Sigismund Francis; Archduke of Austria; 1630–1665
Balthasar Charles; Prince of Asturias; 1629–1646	Charles II of Spain; 1661–1700	Ferdinand IV; King of the Romans; 1633–1654	Leopold I HRE; 1640–1705	Charles Joseph of Austria; 1649–1664
Joseph I HRE; 1678–1711	Charles VI; HRE; 1685–1740
Lorraine
Maria Theresa; HRE; 1740–1780	Francis I HRE; 1745–1765
Habsburg-Lorraine
Joseph II; HRE; 1765–1790	Leopold II; HRE; 1790–1792
Francis II; HRE; 1792–1806

Notes:

Frederick the Fair House of Habsburg Born: c. 1289 Died: 13 January 1330
Regnal titles
Preceded by Albert I	Duke of Austria; 1308–1330 with Leopold I (1308–1326)	Succeeded by Albert II; Otto
Preceded by Henry VII	King of Germany; 1314–1330 with Louis IV first as rival and then as co-king	Succeeded by Louis IV as sole king
