= Herbert Siegert =

German football manager (1920–2008)

Personal information
- Date of birth: 8 February 1920
- Place of birth: German Reich
- Date of death: December 2008 (aged 88)

Managerial career
- Years: Team
- 1964–1968: Tennis Borussia Berlin
- 1968–1974: SpVgg Blau-Weiß 1890 Berlin

Herbert Siegert (8 February 1920 – December 2008) was a German football manager.

Siegert led both Tennis Borussia Berlin and SpVgg Blau-Weiß 1890 Berlin to championship titles in the second tier Regionalliga in 1965 and 1973 respectively.
