= Treaty of Ulm (1326) =

1326 treaty between Frederick the Fair and Louis IV

The Treaty of Ulm established the joint rule of Frederick the Fair and Louis IV, Holy Roman Emperor in the Holy Roman Empire. It was agreed on January 7, 1326.

Under its terms, Frederick would administer the Holy Roman Empire as King of the Romans, and Louis would be crowned Holy Roman Emperor in Rome.
