= Meinhard V of Gorizia =

Austrian nobleman (1297–1318)

Meinhard V, Count of Gorizia
- Born: after 1297
- Died: after 1318
- Noble family: Meinhardiner
- Father: Henry III, Count of Gorizia
- Mother: Beatrix dei Camerino

Meinhard V, Count of Gorizia (b. after 1297 - d. after 1318) was a member of the Albertine line of the House of Gorizia. He was a son of Count Henry III and his first wife Beatrix dei Camerino.

Little is known about his life. He was probably co-ruler with his father. Around 1314, his father negotiated Meinhard's marriage with a daughter of king James II of Aragon.
