= John Meinhard VII of Gorizia =

John Meinhard VII, Count of Gorizia
- Born: either 1378 or 1380
- Died: 22 May 1430
- Noble family: Meinhardiner
- Spouses: Magdalena of Bavaria; Agnes of Pettau-Wurmberg
- Father: Meinhard VI of Gorizia
- Mother: Utehild of Mätsch

John Meinhard VII, Count of Gorizia (1378 or 1380 – 22 May 1430) was a member of the Meinhardiner dynasty. He was a Count Palatine of Carinthia and a Count of Kirchberg.

John Meinhard was a son of Count Meinhard VI and his second wife, Utehild, who was a daughter of Ulrich IV of Mätsch. When his father died in 1385, his elder brother Henry VI inherited Gorizia and John Meinhard VII was promised the County of Kirchberg, from the inheritance of his mother, and the position of Count Palatine in Carinthia.

Johann Meinhard VII married twice. He first married in 1404, to Magdalena of Bavaria, the daughter of the Duke Frederick "the Wise" of Bavaria. In 1422, he married his second wife; she was Agnes, a daughter of Count Bernard of Pettau-Wurmberg. No children from these two marriages are known. He was succeeded as Count of Kirchberg by his brother Henry VI.
