= Anne of Austria, Duchess of Bavaria =

Austrian noblewoman (1318–1343)

Anna of Austria
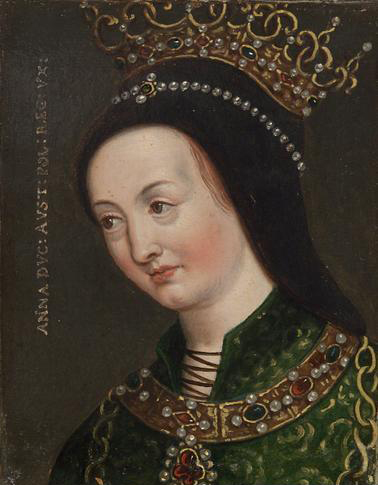
- Anna of Austria by Anton Boys
- Born: 1318
- Died: 1343 (aged 24–25)
- Spouse: Henry XV, Duke of Bavaria; John Henry, Count of Gorizia
- House: House of Habsburg
- Father: Frederick the Fair
- Mother: Isabella of Aragon

Anna of Austria (1318–1343) was the youngest daughter of Frederick the Fair, of Austria and his wife, Isabella of Aragon. Her paternal grandparents were Albert I of Germany and Elisabeth of Tirol. Her maternal grandparents were James II of Aragon and Blanche of Anjou.

== Marriages ==
It was important for Anna to marry since her elder siblings, Frederick and Elizabeth, had died without children.

Anna was originally engaged to the future Casimir III the Great, son of Władysław I the Elbow-high and Jadwiga of Greater Poland, but the plans collapsed after Frederick was defeated at the Battle of Mühldorf.

Between 1326 and 1328, Anna married Henry XV, Duke of Bavaria. The marriage was short; Henry died in 1333 and the couple had no issue.

Anna later married John Henry, Count of Gorizia. This marriage was also childless and Anna was widowed again in 1338.

== Later years ==
Even though Anna was still young, she did not remarry. She went to live in a monastery where she died in 1343. She had outlived both her parents; they both died in 1330. By the time of his death, Anna's father had been deposed from the throne of Germany and had been succeeded by his rival, Louis IV, Holy Roman Emperor.

Preceded by Mechtild of Nassau	Duchess of Upper Bavaria c. 1326 – 18 July 1333	Succeeded by Margaret, Countess of Tyrol (United Bavaria)
