= Georges Colonna Ceccaldi =

Antiquities dealer

Georges Colonna Ceccaldi (7 January 1840, Paris – 1879 or 1892) was a French antiquities dealer and diplomat.

Ceccaldi lived in Beirut where he was an attaché to the French Consulate, he stayed several times in Cyprus between 1866 and autumn 1871, when he returned permanently to France.

Ceccaldi provided various museums with Cypriot antiquities, including the British Museum, the Louvre and in 1872 he sold 40 artefacts from his collection to the Musée d’Archéologie Nationale. He excavated in at the sites of Idalion and Athienou. Additionally, he conducted excavations at Kition.

His brother Tiburce Colonna Ceccaldi was the French consul to Cyprus between 1866 and 1869. He maintained friendly relations with other diplomats engaged in antiquities trade like Robert Hamilton Lang and Luigi Palma di Cesnola. The correspondence of the two brothers with other officials active in the antiquities trade in Cyprus, such as Luigi Palma di Cesnola, was published by Olivier Masson.

== Publications ==
- Ceccaldi, G. C. (1870). Découvertes de Chypre. Revue Archéologique, 21, 23–36.
- Ceccaldi, G. C. (1872). Découvertes en Chypre (Suite). Revue Archéologique, 24, 221–228.
- Ceccaldi, G. C. (1872). La patère d'Idalie. Revue Archéologique, 24, 304–316.
- Ceccaldi, G. C. (1873). La patére d’Idalie (Suite et fin). Revue Archéologique, 25, 18–30.
- Ceccaldi, G. C. (1873). Découvertes en Chypre Note additionnelle. Revue Archéologique, 25, 31–31.
- Ceccaldi, G. C. (1874). Nouvelles inscriptions grecques de Chypre. Revue Archéologique, 27, 79–95.
- Ceccaldi, G. C. (1875). Un sarcophage d'Athienau (Chypre). Revue Archéologique, 29, 22–29.
- Ceccaldi, G. C. (1875). Nouvelles inscriptions grecques de Chypre. Revue Archéologique, 29, 95–101.
- Ceccaldi, g. C. (1876). Patère et rondache trouvées dans un tombeau de la nécropole d’amathonte. Revue Archéologique, 31, 25–36.
- Ceccaldi, G. C. (1877). Découvertes en Chypre les fouilles de Curium. Revue Archéologique, 33, 1–11.
- Ceccaldi, G. C. (1877). Fouilles de Curium (Suite et fin). Revue Archéologique, 33, 177–189.
- Ceccaldi, G. C. (1878). Le monument de Sarba (Djouni de Phénicie) et le site de Palæbyblos. Revue Archéologique, 35, 1–22.
- Ceccaldi, G. C. (1882). Monuments antiques de Chypre, de Syrie et d'Égypte. Paris.
