= Pierre-Fernand Ceccaldi =

French scientist and academic

- Born: 29 November 1917
- Died: 15 December 2006 (aged 89)
- Occupation: Scientist
- Employer: Ministry of the Interior

Pierre-Fernand Ceccaldi (29 November 1917 – 15 December 2006) was a French scientist and academic.

== Biography ==
Born in Jaulnat-Clan (Vienne departement), he pursued studies in the 1940s, earning degrees in both medicine and pharmacy. His interest in biology, especially histology, led him to the Ministry of the Interior, where he served as the head of the scientific police laboratory in Paris from 1957 to 1987. He also served as a professor at the Paris V University.

During his career, Ceccaldi was involved in the integration of various scientific techniques into criminal investigations, covering areas such as biology, ballistics, photography, and electron microscopy. He frequently provided expert testimony in criminal cases.

Ceccaldi's retirement aligned with the emergence of genetic fingerprinting in forensic science.

In 1982, Ceccaldi established the Association for the Identification of Disaster Victims. He also authored several books, including Criminalistics and Legal Medicine for Judicial Use.
