= Albert II of Gorizia =

- Born: before 1275
- Died: 1327
- Noble family: Meinhardiner
- Spouses: Elizabeth of Hesse; Euphemia of Mätsch
- Issue: Albert III, Count of Gorizia; Henry IV, Count of Gorizia; Meinhard VI of Gorizia
- Father: Albert I of Gorizia
- Mother: Euphemia of Głogów

Albert II (died in 1327), a member of the House of Gorizia (Meinhardiner dynasty), ruled as governor of the County of Gorizia from 1323, on behalf of his nephew Count John Henry IV. He inherited from his father only the lands in the Puster Valley.

== Life ==
Albert II was a younger son of Count Albert I of Gorizia and his wife Euphemia, a daughter of the Silesian duke Konrad I of Głogów. He thereby was the younger brother of Henry III, ruling Count of Gorizia upon their father's death in 1304. He inherited only the lands in the Puster Valley. When his brother died in 1323, Albert acted as regent for Henry's minor son John Henry IV.

Albert married Elizabeth, a daughter of Landgrave Henry I of Hesse and, secondly, Euphemia of Mätsch, daughter of bailiff Ulrich II. He was the father of:

- Elizabeth, married Count Herman of Heunburg (d. 1322) and secondly Count William of Schaunberg-Trüchsen
- Catherine, married Ulrich of Waldsee, who was Landeshauptmann of Styria
- Clara, married Herdeggen of Pettau, field marshal of Styria
- Catharina zu Neuhaus, married Ulrich of Taufers at Utenheim
- Albert III (d. 1374)
- Henry IV (d. 1361)
- Meinhard VI (d. 1385)
- Margaret

Albert's three sons succeeded as Counts of Gorizia upon the early death of their cousin John Henry IV in 1338.

Albert II of Gorizia Meinhardiner Born: 1261 Died: c. 1325
Preceded by Henry III	Governor of Gorizia; 1323–1325	Succeeded by John Henry IV
