= Sigehard (patriarch of Aquileia) =

Patriarch of Aquileia from 1068 to 1077

Sigehard or Sieghard (died on 12 August 1077), also known as Sigehard of Beilstein, was patriarch of Aquileia from 1068 to 1077. He was a member of a Bavarian noble family with estates in Chiemgau.

Sigehard remained faithful to Henry IV during the investiture controversy between the Popes and the Holy Roman Emperors. For his loyalty, Henry rewarded Sigehard with the investiture of the Friulan county on 3 April 1077. Struck with a sudden illness, the patriarch died in Ulm a few months after.

With Sigehard the Patriarchs of Aquileia became the direct vassals of the Emperors; their power now extended over a territory which was subject only to their jurisdiction. The territory then constituted an ecclesiastical and political "imperial and Italian principality" (Patriarchal State of Aquileia).

== Sources ==
- Robinson, I. S. (2003) [1999]. Henry IV of Germany, 1056-1106. Cambridge University Press. ISBN 0-521-54590-0.
- Štih, Peter (2010). The Middle Ages between the Eastern Alps and the Northern Adriatic: Select Papers on Slovene Historiography and Medieval History. East Central and Eastern Europe in the Middle Ages, 450-1450. Vol. 11. BRILL. ISBN 978-90-04-18591-3.
