= Leonhard of Gorizia =

Leonhard
- Count of Görz
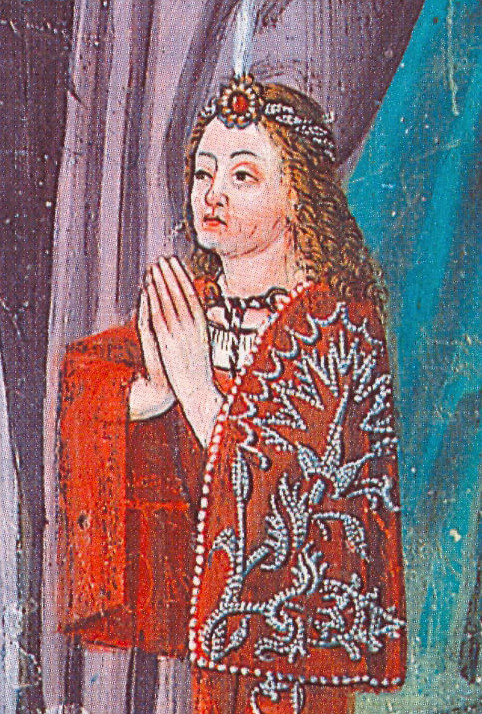
- Born: 1440; Lienz, County of Görz
- Died: 12 April 1500 (aged 59–60); Lienz
- Noble family: Meinhardiner dynasty
- Spouses: Hieronyma of Ilok; Paola Gonzaga
- Father: Henry VI of Gorizia
- Mother: Catherine of Garay

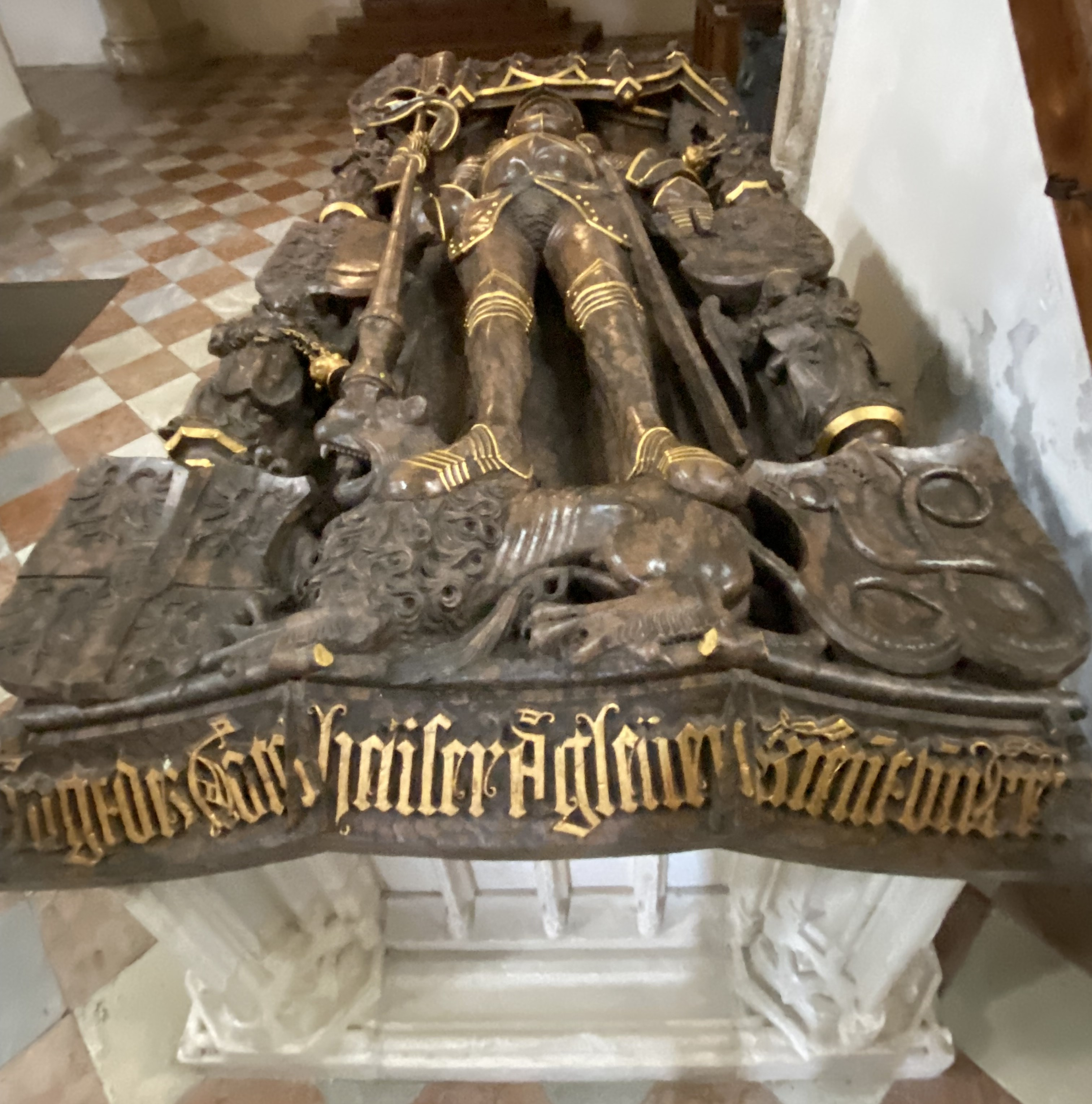
Tomb of Leonhard in Lienz

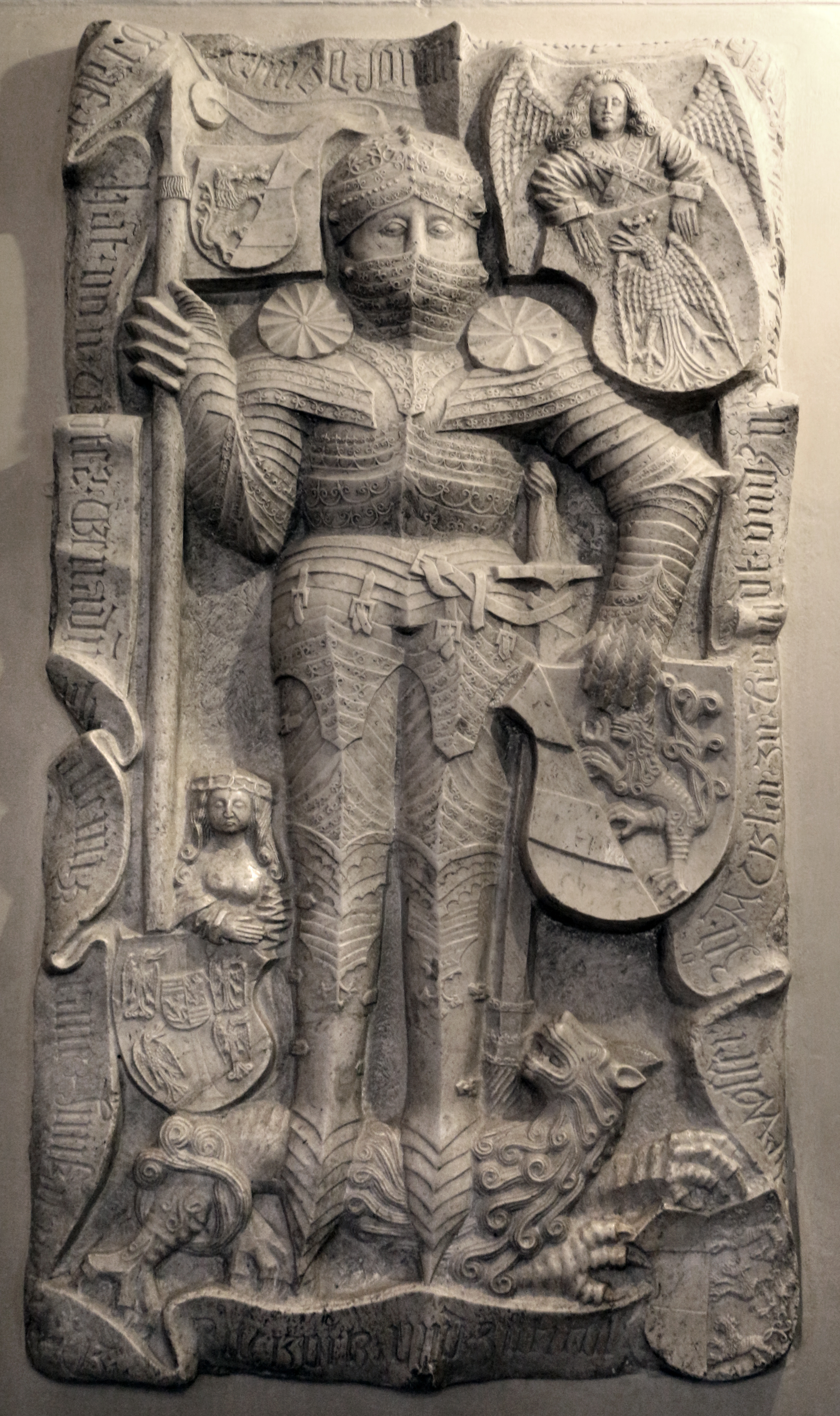
Cenotaph of Leonhard in Gorizia

Leonhard (1440 – 12 April 1500) was the last count of Gorizia from the Meinhardiner dynasty. He ruled at Lienz and Gorizia (Görz) from 1454 until his death. He also held the title and rights as a count palatine of Carinthia.

== Family ==
Leonhard was born at Bruck Castle in Lienz, the comital residence of the House of Gorizia. He was the son of Henry VI, Count of Gorizia, and his wife, Catherine, a daughter of the Hungarian palatine Nicholas II Garay. In 1454 he succeeded his father, who left him an almost ruined county with two separate territories.

Leonhards first marriage to Hieronyma of Ilok, the daughter of Nicholas of Ilok, King of Bosnia had produced no issue. After her death in 1460 Leonhard married second, in 1478, Paola Gonzaga, the daughter of the Italian marquis Ludovico III of Mantua, and together they had a daughter who died as an infant.

During the negotiations for his marriage, Andrea da Schivenoglia, chronicler of the Gonzaga family, described the then 36-old Count of Gorizia as "pleasant and joyful" (piaxevolo et zoioso).

== Early reign ==
Leonhard at first ruled jointly with his brothers John II and Louis. John as the eldest apparently held most of the power while younger Louis did not exercise any political role and died between 1456 and 1457. The brothers had to face the hostility of Emperor Frederick III who aimed to seize their remaining "outer county" around the town of Lienz and the Puster Valley, separating the Habsburg hereditary lands of Tyrol and Carinthia, which had been possessions of the Meinhardiner dynasty until the 14th century.

Moreover, John and Leonhard picked a fierce inheritance conflict around the lands of the extinct counts of Celje after the death of Count Ulrich II in 1456, whereupon the defeated brothers not only had to renounce all their claims but also were forced to cede the residence at Lienz and various territories in Carinthia to Frederick III. The Counts of Görz had to move to Heinfels Castle. John died in 1462 and Leonhard became sole ruler. With the help of his capable deputy Virgil von Graben, a relative from the House of Graben von Stein, he recovered Lienz. Later Leonhard also get back the title and rights as a Count palatine of Carinthia.

== Succession ==
Facing the extinction of the dynasty, sickly Count Leonhard became subject to the competing pressures of both the Imperial Habsburg dynasty and the Republic of Venice, which both competed for his heritage. The Venice Ten, who since 1434 ruled over the Domini di Terraferma in Friuli, intended to seize the adjacent "inner county" centered on the town of Gorizia itself.

During his reign his administrator Virgil von Graben was persuaded by grand promises by King Maximilian I to end his hitherto secret association with the Venetians and instead advocate the country's accession to the Habsburg Empire. The enlightened views of the Republic of Venice and its decision-makers would have recognized the Gorizian (Meinhardin) bastard Von Graben himself as the new Count of Gorizia. Another suggestion was that Von Graben would hand over the County of Gorizia to the Republic and in exchange would receive all Gorizia castles and lordships in Friuli and Venice as a fief. But it didn't come to that. In 1498, Virgil von Graben gave his son Lukas von Graben authority over the gorizian Burghut. First, the Council of Ten of the Republic of Venice considered appointing Lukas von Graben as their supreme commander in Friuli. However, since Virgil von Graben ended the contract with Venice about the succession in the County of Gorizia and negotiated with Maximilian I, this appointment did not materialize. In the end Leonhard leaned towards the Habsburgs and signed an inheritance treaty with Maximilian I. After the death of Leonhard on 12 April 1500 and the Gorizia inheritance in favor of the Habsburgs, the Venetians saw their failure solely in the actions of the lords Virgil and Lukas von Graben.

Upon his death, Austrian troops immediately occupied the town of Gorizia. The Habsburgs (re-)united Lienz with the County of Tyrol and went on to rule as Counts in Gorizia (Gorizia and Gradisca from 1754). Leonhard's former deputy Virgil von Graben, who had played a vital role in the convergence to the Habsburg dynasty, took the position as a Stadtholder in Lienz from them.

== Burial ==
Following Leonhard's death, Maximilian ordered the erection of a monumental tomb in the parish church of Saint Andreas in Lienz, created by sculptor Christoph Geiger and completed in 1507. The monumental slab in brown marble displays Leonhard in body armor surrounded by four angels with the arms of the Garai family (of his mother), the House of Gonzaga (his wife), Carinthia (as Count Palatine), Tyrol (as nominal Count), and Gorizia. The inscription reads "Hie ligt begraben der hochgeboren Fürst und Herr Herr Lienhard Pfhalzgrave in Kharnnten Grave zu Görtz und Tirol Vogt der Gotsheuser Agleuen Triennt und Brixen Der gestorben ist am zwelfften Tag des Aprilln 1500 Jar Dem Got genedig sei". The monument was dismantled in 1781 and carefully restored from scattered fragments in 1967-1969. A separate cenotaph was erected in Gorizia Cathedral, with a similar inscription in Italian.

Preceded by Henry VI	Count of Görz; 1454-1500 jointly with John II 1454-1462 and Louis 1454-1457	Succeeded by Maximilian I of Austria
