= House of Gorizia =

Noble family in the Holy Roman Empire

House of Gorizia Meinhardiner
- Country: Kingdom of Bohemia; Duchy of Carinthia; County of Gorizia; County of Tyrol
- Origin: Puster Valley, Tyrol
- Founded: High Middle Ages
- Founder: Meinhard I, Count of Gorizia
- Final ruler: Leonhard, Count of Gorizia, Count Palatine of Carinthia
- Titles: King of Bohemia and Margrave of Moravia; King of Poland; Duke of Carinthia; Landgrave and Duke of Carniola; Landgrave of Savinja; Princely Count of Görz and Tyrol
- Dissolution: 1500

The House of Gorizia, also called the Meinhardiner, were a comital, princely and ducal dynasty in the Holy Roman Empire. Named after Gorizia Castle in Gorizia (now in Italy, on the border with Slovenia), they were originally "advocates" (Vogts) in the Patriarchate of Aquileia who ruled the County of Gorizia (Görz) from the early 12th century until the year 1500. Staunch supporters of the Emperors against the papacy, they reached the height of their power in the aftermath of the battle of Marchfeld between the 1280s and 1310s, when they controlled most of contemporary Slovenia, western and south-western Austria and part of northeast Italy mostly as (princely) Counts of Gorizia and Tyrol, Landgraves of Savinja and Dukes of Carinthia and Carniola. After 1335, they began a steady decline until their territories had shrunk back to the original County of Gorizia by the mid 1370s. Their remaining lands were inherited by the Habsburg ruler Maximilian I.

== Overview ==
The Meinhardiner were mentioned as Count of Gorizia in 1117. From 1253, the dynasty ruled the County of Tyrol. In 1271, their vast possessions were split. The main branch kept the recently acquired Tyrol and became known as Counts of Gorizia-Tyrol or the Meinhardiner Line after Meinhard, Duke of Carinthia. The cadet branch, known as the Albertine Line, after Meinhard's younger brother Albert, took over the original possessions in the County of Gorizia, the Puster Valley, as well as the title of palatine counts in Carinthia (together with the domains in the upper Drava Valley).

Both branches participated in the coalition against the Premyslid king Ottokar II of Bohemia on the side of king Rudolf I of Germany and were awarded vast estates after the former's defeat in the Battle of Marchfeld. In 1286, the Gorizia-Tyrol line became Dukes of Carinthia and margraves of Carniola, and took over de facto rule in Savinja, while the Albertine branch was granted most of the Windic March and the County of Metlika. In 1306 and again from 1307 to 1310, Henry of Gorizia-Tyrol ruled as King of Bohemia and hold the titular title of King of Poland, due to his marriage with the Přemyslid heiress Anne. However, as Henry left no male heirs, the Gorizia-Tyrol branch became extinct upon the death of his daughter Margaret in 1369. Their lands were inherited by the Habsburgs.

The Albertine line maintained the rule in the comital lands around Gorizia, in the Puster Valley and in western Carinthia (which comprised the territory of contemporary East Tyrol) until the year 1500, when the family's last count (Leonhard of Gorizia) died without an heir. His remaining estates were inherited by the Austrian House of Habsburg.

== History ==
The dynasty probably hailed from the Rhenish Franconian Siegharding dynasty, which originally descended from the Kraichgau region and in the 10th century ruled in the Chiemgau of the German stem duchy of Bavaria. One Sieghardinger named Meginhard (or Meinhard, d. 1090) is documented as a count in the Bavarian gau of Pustertal. The progenitor of the Meinhardiner, Count Meinhard I of Gorizia, and his brother Engelbert, count palatine of Bavaria, may be his sons. The dynasty first appeared around Lienz and in the 11th century gained the office of a vogt at the town of Gorizia (Görz) in the Patriarchate of Aquileia.

=== Gorizia-Tyrol ===
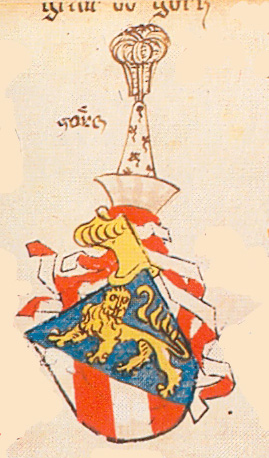
Coat of arms of the Counts of Görz, Ingeram Codex of Archduke Albert VI of Austria, 1459

Tyrol already in the early and later Middle Ages was an important mountain pass area with the lowest crossings over the Central Eastern Alps, vital for the Holy Roman Emperors to reach the Kingdom of Italy. The centres of the Imperial power were initially two Prince-bishoprics established by Emperor Conrad II in 1027, Brixen (Bressanone) and Trient (Trento). The bishops were the sovereigns of many semi-free compulsory henchmen (ministeriales) and local noblemen which styled until today the scenery with their numerous castles mostly south of the Brenner Pass. One of that noble families were the Counts of Tyrol, named after the Castle Tyrol near the town of Meran. They speedily ascended as bailiffs, who exercised the judicial power for the Trient and Brixen prince-bishops and finally took over the secular power in southern Bavaria after the deposition of the Welf duke Henry the Lion in 1180. One result of their becoming rulers of the area, was that the area is now called "Tyrol", after their ancestral castle.

Between 1253 and 1258 the Counts of Görz assumed the power in the Tyrolean lands, after the counts at Castle Tyrol had failed to produce a male heir. In 1237 Count Meinhard III had married Adelheid, daughter of Count Albert IV of Tyrol, who died in 1253 leaving no male heirs, and could in this way claim Tyrol as his inheritance. His son and successor Count Meinhard IV not only expanded the county, but also molded it into a more homogeneous country. He also created an administration, which, by the standards of his time, can only be called exemplary. Nevertheless, the three areas of country were too far apart to be ruled by a single count, and therefore it was decided to divide the county in 1267/71, when Meinhard IV ceded the County of Gorizia to his younger brother Albert I. Albert's descendants, the Gorizia line of the Meinhardiner dynasty, maintained their residence in Gorizia, until the line died out in 1500. The descendants of Meinhard IV, who was Count of Tyrol as Meinhard II, ruled Tyrol until 1363.

In 1286 Meinhard IV had also received the rule over the Duchy of Carinthia and the adjacent March of Carniola by the Habsburg king Rudolph I of Germany in turn for his support against King Ottokar II of Bohemia. Meinhard's son Henry in 1306 married Anne, the eldest daughter of King Wenceslaus II of Bohemia, and after the sudden death of his brother-in-law King Wenceslaus III in the same year even ascended the Bohemian throne. He however had to deal with claims raised by the Habsburg scion Rudolph III, son of King Albert I of Germany, and in the long run both could not prevail against Count John of Luxembourg, who became Bohemian king in 1310.

=== Decline ===
As Henry himself left no male heirs upon his death in 1335, the Austrian House of Habsburg inherited Carinthia and Carniola from the Gorizia-Tyrol branch. The Habsburgs held these lands until 1918. Henry's only surviving daughter Margaret "Maultasch" and her husband John Henry of Luxembourg were able to retain the County of Tyrol. In 1363 she ceded the county to the Habsburg duke Rudolph IV of Austria after her only son with her second husband Duke Louis V of Bavaria, Count Meinhard III of Gorizia-Tyrol had died in the same year.

The Counts of Gorizia were moreover the Bailiffs of Aquileja. They are famous in numismatics as publishers of the first German golden coin, the "Zwainziger". The renowned diplomat and minnesinger Oswald von Wolkenstein was a subject of the Counts of Gorizia.

==== Gorizia heritage ====
The Gorizia branch of the dynasty became extinct in the year 1500, when the last male family member Count Leonhard of Gorizia, Count Palatine of Carinthia, died without issues. Years before, facing the extinction of the dynasty, sickly Leonhard became subject to the competing pressures of both the Imperial Habsburg monarchy and the Republic of Venice, which both competed for his heritage. During his later reign his administrator Virgil von Graben was persuaded by grand promises by King Maximilian I to end his hitherto secret association with the Venetians and instead advocate the country's accession to the Habsburg Empire. The enlightened views of the Republic of Venice and its decision-makers would have recognized the Gorizian (Meinhardin) bastard Von Graben himself as the new Count of Gorizia. Another suggestion was that Von Graben would hand over the County of Gorizia to the Republic and in exchange would receive all Gorizia castles and lordships in Friuli and Venice as a fief. But it didn't come to that. In 1498, Virgil von Graben gave his son Lukas von Graben authority over the gorizian Burghut. First, the Council of Ten of the Republic of Venice considered appointing Lukas von Graben as their supreme commander in Friuli. However, since Virgil von Graben ended the contract with Venice about the succession in the County of Gorizia and negotiated with Maximilian I, this appointment did not materialize. In the end Leonhard leaned towards the Habsburgs and signed an inheritance treaty with Maximilian I. After the death of Leonhard on 12 April 1500 and the Gorizia inheritance in favor of the Habsburgs, the Venetians saw their failure solely in the actions of the lords Virgil and Lukas von Graben. Upon his death, Austrian troops immediately occupied the town of Gorizia and Virgil vin Graben became his successor as imperial stadtholder of Lienz in East Tyrol. The Habsburgs (re-)united Lienz with the County of Tyrol and went on to rule as Counts in Gorizia (Gorizia and Gradisca from 1754).

=== Offspring ===
One apparent or illegitimate branch of the Meinhardiner where the Herren von Graben family, from which descend the Counts and Princes Orsini-Rosenberg. The Netherlands family of De Graeff claim descent from the Von Graben as well.

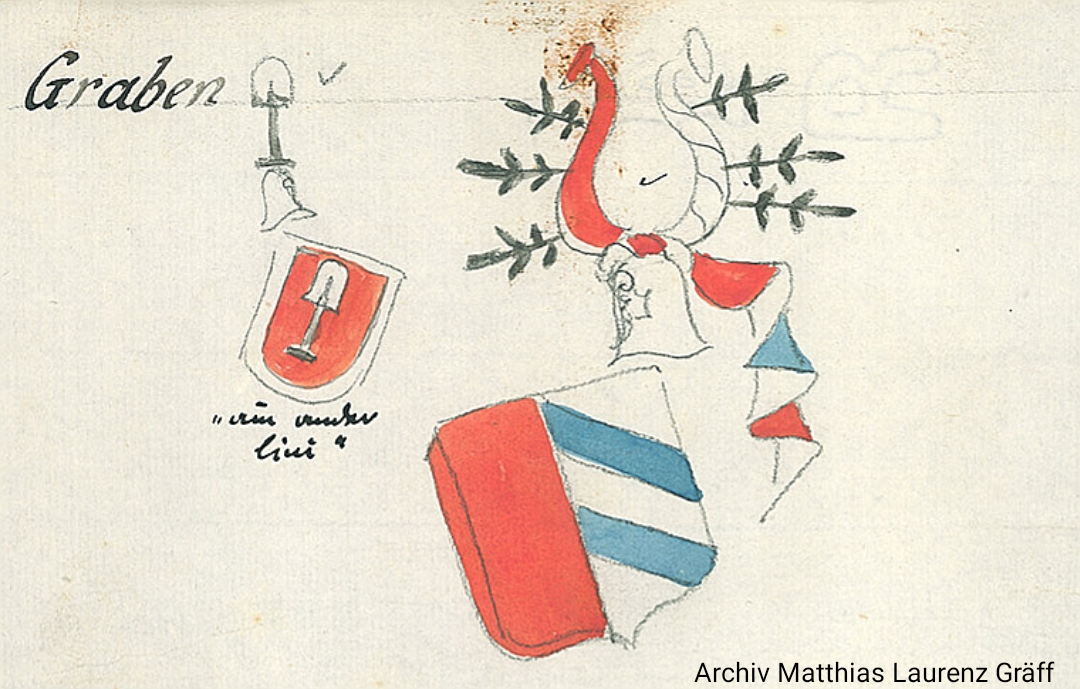
Coat of arms Von Graben

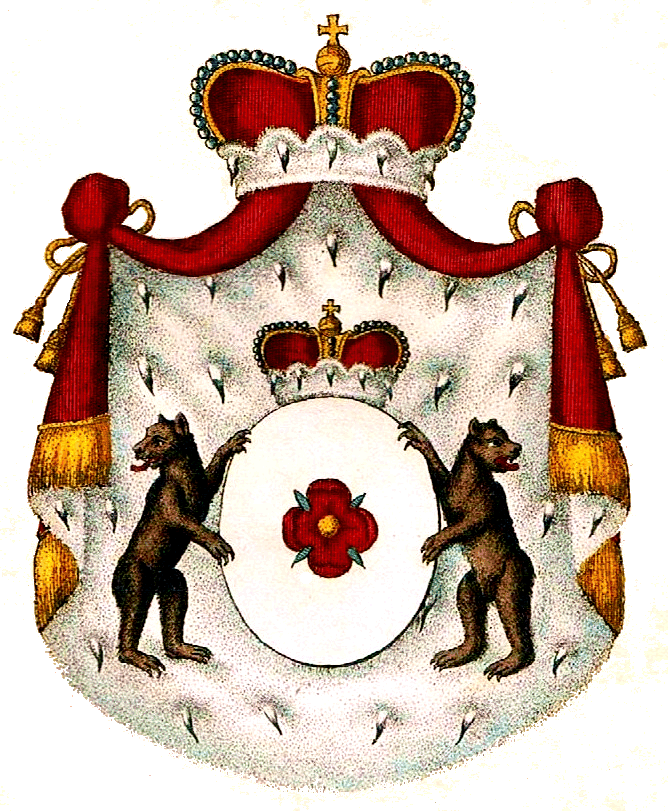
Coat of arms Orsini-Rosenberg

Coat of arms (De) Graeff

== Counts ==
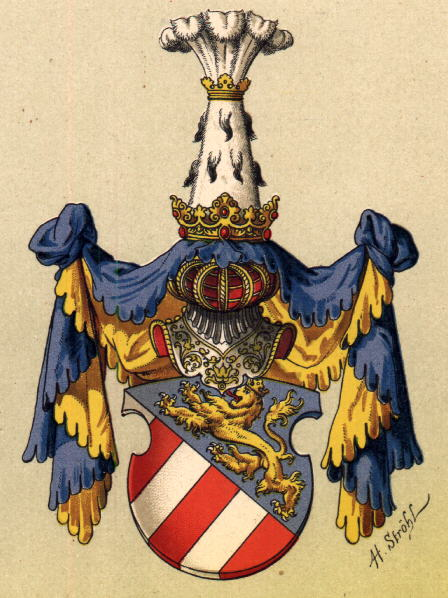
Görz coat of arms, as drawn by Hugo Gerard Ströhl, 1890

- Marquard (fl. 1060/1074), Vogt of Aquileia
- Meginhard (died about 1090), from the House of Siegharding, Count in the Puster Valley
- Henry I (died after 1102), Vogt of Aquileia from 1082
  - Ulrich (died 1122), brother
- Meinhard I (died 1139/1142), descent uncertain, mentioned as Count of Gorizia in 1117, jointly with his brother
  - Engelbert I (died c. 1122), also count palatine of Bavaria and Vogt of Millstatt Abbey in Carinthia
- Engelbert II (1142–1191), son of Meinhard I, jointly with his brother
  - Henry II (1142–1150)
- Engelbert III (1191–1220), son of Engelbert II, jointly with his brother
  - Meinhard II the Elder (1191–1231)
- Meinhard III (1231–1253), son of Engelbert III

Inherited Tyrol in 1253

=== Gorizia-Tyrol ===
- Meinhard I (Meinhard III of Gorizia, 1253–1258)
- Meinhard II (1258–1295), elder son of Meinhard I, Count of Tyrol after partition in 1271, also Duke of Carinthia from 1286
- Henry (1295–1335), son of Meinhard II, Count of Tyrol and Duke of Carinthia, King of Bohemia 1306 and 1307–1310
  - Otto (1295–1310), brother, Count of Tyrol and Duke of Carinthia
- Margaret, Countess of Tyrol (1335–1363), daughter of Henry

Line extinct, Tyrol fell to House of Habsburg

=== Gorizia ===
- Albert I (1258–1304), younger son of Meinhard I of Gorizia-Tyrol, ruled jointly with his brother Meinhard II until 1271
- Albert II (1304–1325), son of Albert I, jointly with his brother
  - Henry III (1304–1323) until 1307 partition, succeeded by
- John Henry IV (1323–1338), son of Henry III
- Meinhard VI (1338-1385), son of Albert II, Princely Count from 1365, and his brothers
  - Albert III (1338–1374)
  - Henry V (1338–1362)
- Henry VI (1385–1454), son of Meinhard VI, jointly with his brother
  - John Meinhard VII (1385–1429)
- Leonhard (1454–1500), son of Henry VI, jointly with his brothers
  - John II (1454–1462)
  - Louis (1454–after 1456)

Possessions to House of Habsburg, Gorizia part of Inner Austria from 1564 to 1619, Lienz unified with Tyrol

=== Other family members ===
- Elisabeth of Gorizia-Tyrol (1262–1312), daughter of Meinhard IV, Queen-consort of the Romans in 1298 by marriage with King Albert I of Germany
- Elisabeth of Carinthia (1298 – after 1347), her niece, granddaughter of Meinhard IV by his son Otto, in 1337 queen-consort of Sicily as wife of King Peter II of Sicily
- Meinhard V (d. after 1318), son of Henry III

== Family tree of Gorizia ==
Meinhard I count of Gorizia; HOUSE OF GORIZIA
Engelbert II count of Gorizia
Albert IV count of Tyrol	Engelbert III count of Gorizia	Meinhard II count of Gorizia
Adelaide countess of Tyrol	Meinhard III count of Gorizia, I of Tyrol
Meinhard duke of Carinthia, II count of Tyrol, IV of Gorizia	Wenceslaus II king of Bohemia	Albert I count of Gorizia
Albert I king of Germany; HABSBURG	Elisabeth of Carinthia	Otto III duke of Carinthia	2.Adelaide of Brunswick-Lüneburg; 3.Beatrice of Savoy	Henry king of Bohemia, VI duke of Carinthia, count of Tyrol	1.Anne of Premyslids queen of Bohemia	Henry III count of Gorizia	Albert II count of Gorizia
Albert II duke of Austria, Carinthia	1.John Henry margrave of Moravia; LUXEMBOURG	Margaret countess of Tyrol	2.Louis V duke of Bavaria; WITTELSBACH	Meinhard V count of Gorizia	John Henry IV count of Gorizia	Albert III count of Gorizia	Henry V count of Gorizia	Meinhard VI count of Gorizia
Rudolf IV duke of Austria, Carinthia, count of Tyrol	Meinhard III count of Tyrol	Henry VI count of Gorizia	John Meinhard VII count of Kirchberg
John II count of Gorizia	Leonard count of Gorizia
