= Ingeram Codex =

1459 roll of arms by Hans Ingeram

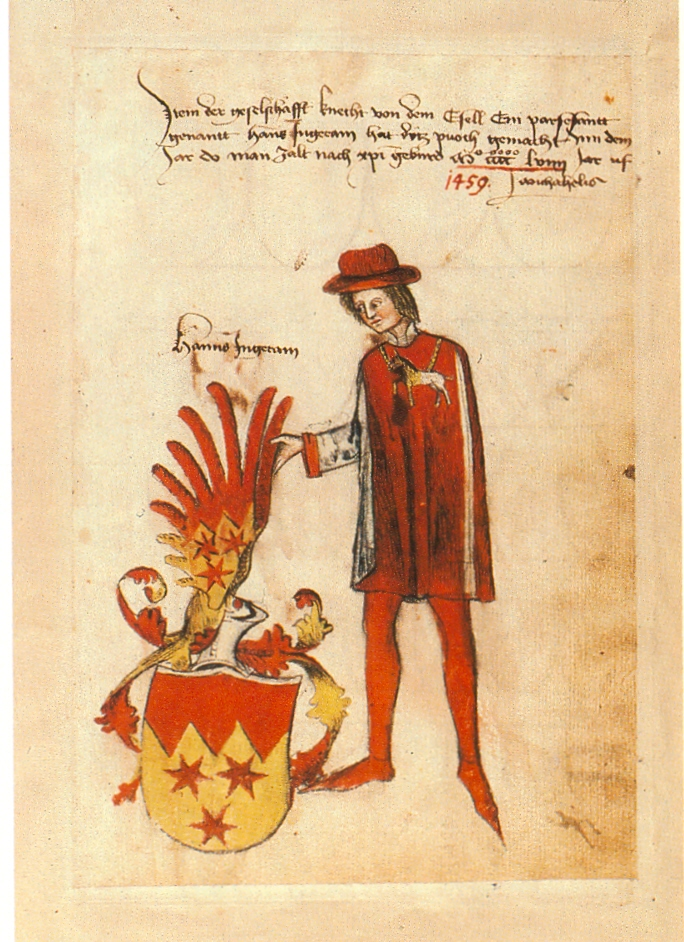
Hans Ingeram's portrait, coat of arms and colophon

The Ingeram Codex (also Codex Cotta, Kunsthistorisches Museum A2302) is an armorial of the Holy Roman Empire made by Hans Ingeram for Albert VI, Archduke of Austria in 1459. It is largely concerned with the coats of arms of the Adelsgesellschaften ("societies of nobles") fashionable at the time, a type of society or order formed by members of the lower nobility with the purpose of holding tournaments.

The manuscript has 142 paper pages with depictions of coats of arms mostly in groups of four or six per page.

The contents are divided into

- Habsburg possessions and Austrian nobility (pp. 1–10).
- Exempla, attributed arms to (partly legendary) "exemplary" persons (including the Nine Worthies). (12–17)
- Offices (18–27)
- fragments of a "European" armorial (28–35)
- coats of arms of Habsburg Austria, including the seceded Old Swiss Confederacy (36–39, p. 40 empty)
- coats of arms of Adelsgesellschaften (tournament societies) (41–134)

After the death of Albrecht VI, the manuscript passed to his brother, emperor Frederick III, and later to Ladislaus Jagiellon, presumably via Matthias Corvinus, who would have gained its possession when he invaded Vienna in 1485. In 1541, it was owned by cardinal Gasparo Contarini, and by 1751 it was in the antiquarian collection of count Löwenstein-Wertheim, whence it was acquired by publisher Johann Friedrich Cotta in the early 19th century. Sold to one Heinrich Höfflinger in 1929, the codex finally passed to Kunsthistorisches Museum in 1971.
