= Burg Bruck =

Castle in Austria

Coordinates: 46°49′54″N 12°44′56″E

- Tyrol, Austria
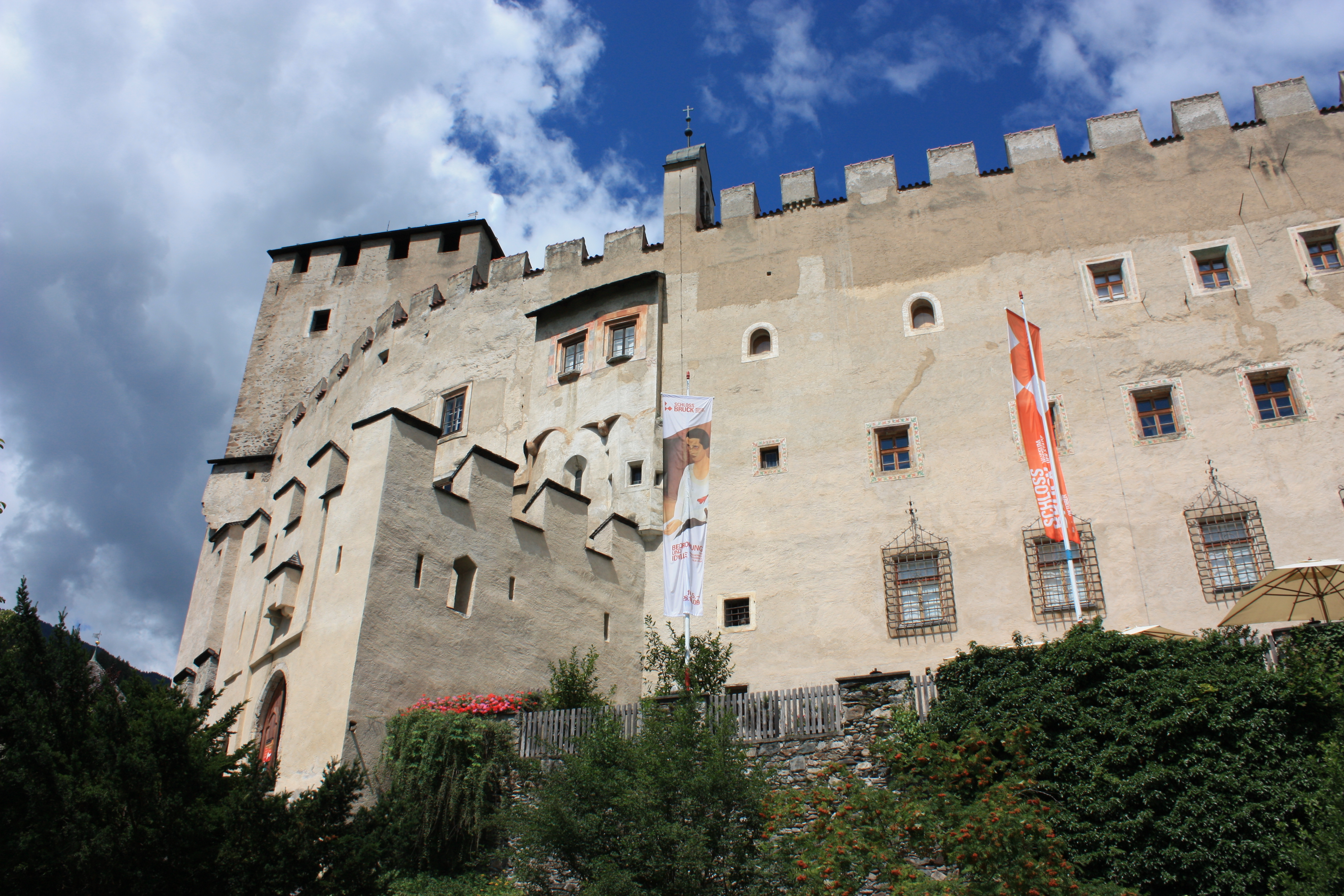

Site information
- Type: Castle
- Owner: City of Lienz
- Open to the public: Yes
- Condition: Preserved

Site history
- Built: From about 1252

Burg Bruck is a medieval castle in Lienz in Tyrol, Austria. Burg Bruck is 711 metres (2,333 ft) above sea level.

It was completed in 1278 as the residence of the Meinhardiner Counts of Görz. In 1490 the chapel was decorated with frescoes by Simon von Taisten. In 1500 the last count Leonhard of Gorizia bequeathed the castle to the House of Habsburg archduke Holy Roman Emperor Maximilian I, who incorporated it into his County of Tyrol possessions. During the Campaigns of 1796 in the French Revolutionary Wars it was occupied by French First Republic troops under General Barthélemy Catherine Joubert.

== Museum ==
In 1942 Burg Bruck was purchased by the city of Lienz. A museum was opened in 1945. The in-house collection includes paintings, sculptures, and folk art. The museum features many works of the painter Albin Egger-Lienz. It also serves as cultural venue in Lienz, hosting theater performances, concerts, readings, and soirées.

== See also ==
- List of castles in Austria
