= Maynard (surname) =

Maynard is a Norman/Germanic/English surname meaning "strength, hardy".

== People ==
Notable people with the surname include:

- Abra K. Maynard (1803–1894), American farmer and politician
- Alan Maynard (1944–2018), British health economist
- Amory Maynard (1804–1890), Industrialist, founder of Maynard, Massachusetts
- Bernadette Maynard (1907–2000), American politician
- Bill Maynard (1928–2018), English comedian and actor
- Brad Maynard (born 1974), American football punter and holder
- Brayden Maynard (born 1996), Australian rules footballer
- Brittany Maynard (1984–2014), American activist for assisted suicide
- Bruno Maynard (born 1971), French ice hockey player
- Charles Johnson Maynard (1845–1929), American naturalist and ornithologist
- Sir Charles Clarkson Martin Maynard (1870–1945), senior British Army officer
- Conor Maynard (born 1992), British singer
- David Swinson Maynard ("Doc" Maynard), American pioneer, first doctor in Seattle
- Diana Maynard, British computational linguist
- Don Maynard (1935–2022), American football player
- Dori J. Maynard (1958–2015), President and CEO of the Maynard Institute (2008); daughter of Robert C. Maynard
- Edward Maynard (1813–1891), American firearms inventor
- Farnham Maynard, Australian Anglican clergyman and first president of the Council for Aboriginal Rights
- Finian Maynard (born 1975), world champion windsurfer
- Forster Maynard (1893–1976), British military commander
- Fred Maynard (1879–1946), Aboriginal Australian activist, founder of Australian Aboriginal Progressive Association (AAPA)
- Gray Maynard (born 1979), American mixed martial arts fighter
- Hannah Maynard (1834–1918), Canadian photographer
- Horace Maynard (1814–1882), Tennessee Congressman and U.S. Postmaster General
- Isaac H. Maynard (1838–1896), New York lawyer
- James Maynard (born 1987), British mathematician
- Jay Maynard (born 1960), American computer programmer
- John Maynard (disambiguation), several people
- Joyce Maynard (born 1953), American author
- Kelvin Maynard (1987–2019), Dutch professional soccer player
- Ken Maynard (1895–1973), American movie stuntman and actor
- Ken Maynard (cartoonist) (1928–1998), Australian cartoonist
- Kermit Maynard (1897–1971), American actor
- Kyle Maynard (born 1986), American speaker, author and athlete
- Louis Maynard (1871–1940), French writer and historian
- Marjorie Maynard (1891–1975), British artist and farmer
- Mark R. Maynard (born 1972), West Virginia politician
- Matthew Maynard (born 1966), ex-cricketer
- Merv Maynard (c. 1931-2017), Aboriginal Australian jockey, son of Fred and father of historian John Maynard
- Michelle Maynard, Western Australian politician
- Nathan Maynard, Aboriginal Australian playwright, recipient of Balnaves Fellowship in 2019
- Nicky Maynard (born 1986), MK Dons F.C. striker
- Ralph Maynard Smith, (1904–1964) architect
- Richard Maynard (1832–1907), Canadian photographer
- Robert Maynard (disambiguation), several people
- Spike Maynard (1942–2014), Justice of the West Virginia Supreme Court of Appeals
- Stuart Maynard (born 1980), English football manager
- Thane Maynard, wildlife expert
- Tom Maynard, (1989–2012), English cricketer
- William H. Maynard (1786–1832), New York politician

== Fictional characters ==
- Christopher Maynard, fictional antagonist from the 1996 film, The Glimmer Man, played by Stephen Tobolowsky
- John Maynard, protagonist of a ballad by the German writer Theodor Fontane

== See also ==
- John Maynard Smith (1920–2004), British theoretical evolutionary biologist and geneticist
- Julian Maynard Smith, performance artist, founder of Station House Opera, son of John Maynard Smith
