= Maynard =

Maynard may refer to:

== People and fictional characters ==
- Maynard (given name)
- Maynard (surname)

== Places ==
=== Canada ===
- Maynard, Ontario, a village in Augusta Township

=== United States ===
- Maynard, Arkansas
- Maynard, Iowa
- Maynard, Kentucky
- Maynard, Massachusetts
- Maynard, Minnesota
- Maynard, Ohio

== Other uses ==
- Maynard (album), by Maynard Ferguson, 1981
- Maynard (software), a shell for Weston competing with the GNOME Shell
- Maynard Electronics, an American company that manufactured tape drives in the 1990s
- The Maynard School, a girls' school in Exeter, UK
- Maynard tape primer, a system for reloading muskets
- Maynards, a sweets manufacturer in the United Kingdom

== See also ==
- Justice Maynard (disambiguation)
- Maynard v. Cartwright, a 1988 United States Supreme Court case
