= Maynard Smith (disambiguation) =

John Maynard Smith (1920–2004) was an evolutionary geneticist.

Maynard Smith may also refer to:

- Maynard Harrison Smith (1911–1984), US recipient of the Medal of Honor

== Other people with the surname ==
- Sidney Maynard Smith (1875-1928), British surgeon
- Ralph Maynard Smith (1904–1964), architect
- Julian Maynard Smith (born 1964), performance artist and co-founder of the London-based performance company Station House Opera
