= Ralph Smith =

Ralph Smith may refer to:

== Politics ==
- Ralph Smith (Canadian politician) (1858–1917), Canadian politician, Labor leader, and coal miner
- Ralph T. Smith (1915–1972), American lawyer and senator from Illinois
- Ralph K. Smith (born 1942), American politician and businessman from Virginia

== Sports ==
- Ralph Smith (American football) (1938–2023), American gridiron footballer
- Ralph Smith (swimmer) (fl. 1988), Australian Paralympian

== Other uses ==
- Ralph C. Smith (1893–1998), American soldier and army general
- Ralph Maynard Smith (1904–1964), British artist, writer and architect

== See also ==
- Ralphsmith (surname)
