= Mannhardt =

Mannhardt is a surname. Notable people with the surname include:

- Johann Mannhardt (1798–1878), German clockmaker, mechanic, and inventor
- Wilhelm Mannhardt (1831–1880), German scholar and folklorist

== See also ==
- Mainhardt, a town in Baden-Württemberg, Germany
- Meinhardt (disambiguation)
