= Maynard (given name) =

Maynard is a masculine given name.

== People ==
Notable people with the name include:

- Maynard (Australian media personality), DJ with ABC in Australia
- Maynard Ferguson (1928–2006), Canadian jazz trumpeter
- Maynard Jackson (1938–2003), former mayor of Atlanta, Georgia
- Maynard James Keenan (born 1964), singer for the bands Tool, A Perfect Circle and Puscifer (born James Herbert Keenan)
- John Maynard Keynes (1883–1946), English economist
- Maynard C. Krueger (1906–1991), socialist professor and politician
- Maynard Lyndon (1907-1999), American architect
- Maynard Jack Ramsay (1914–2005), American entomologist
- Maynard Reece (1920–2020), American artist
- Maynard Harrison Smith (1911–1984), US recipient of the Medal of Honor
- Maynard Solomon (1930-2020), American music producer and musicologist
- Maynard Wallace (1943-2021), American politician
- Maynard Webb Chairman of the Board of Directors at Yahoo!
- Robert Maynard Jones (Bobi Jones; 1929-2017), Welsh poet and academic

== Fictional characters ==
Fictional characters with the given or single name "Maynard" include:

- Brother Maynard, a monk in Monty Python and the Holy Grail
- Maynard, one of the main antagonists in Pulp Fiction (film)
- Maynard (Bluey character), a character in the Australian children's TV series Bluey
- Maynard G. Krebs, character in The Many Loves of Dobie Gillis
- Maynard James "M.J." Delfino, fictional character in the television show Desperate Housewives, played by Mason Vale Cotton

== See also ==
- Mainard
- Meinhard (disambiguation)
- Meinhardt
- Maynard (surname)
