= Cahiers intempestifs =

French publishing house

Cahiers intempestifs is a French publishing house of books on the visual arts, including contemporary art and graphic arts.

== History ==
It was founded in 1993 by Rémi Guichard and Véronique Gay-Rosier. Since the beginning Véronique Gay-Rosier has been editor and art director. The publishing director was Jacques Claude from 2006 to 2015 and has been Jean-Christophe Aussel since 2015.

== Collections ==
Its main publications are :

• A bi-annual contemporary art magazine, called Cahiers intempestifs.

• A collection of graphic art books.

• A collection of design objects.

Cahiers intempestifs is also well known for its experimentation with multimedia, augmented reality, social networking…

== Authors and Artists published ==
Txomin Badiola, Jean-Christophe Bailly, Miquel Barceló, Jacquie Barral, Lionel Bayol-Thémines, Jean-Pierre Bertrand, Jean-Sylvain Bieth, Jean-Noël Blanc, Stéphane Bouquet, Lionel Bourg, Yves Bresson, Pierre Buraglio, Michel Butor, Sophie Calle, Georges-Olivier Châteaureynaud, Noëlle Châtelet, Éric Chevillard, Robert Combas, Patrick Corillon, Marie Denis, Erik Dietman, Jimmie Durham, CharlElie, Tessa Farmer, Philippe Favier, Federico Ferrari, Ian Hamilton Finlay, Paul Fournel, Christian Garcin, Ludger Gerdes, Jochen Gerz, Paul-Armand Gette, Peter Greenaway, Raphaëlle de Groot, Marie-Ange Guilleminot, Susan Hiller, Éric Holder, Fabrice Hybert, Wang Jiuliang, Jacques Jouet, Isaac Julien, Sharon Kivland, Anne Lacaton, Philippe Lacoue-Labarthe, Jean Le Gac, Sol LeWitt, Tomás Maia, François Martin, Jean-François Manier, Keiichi Matsuda, Julian Maynard Smith & Station House Opera, Abdelwahab Meddeb, Charles Melman, Daniel Mesguich, Christian Milovanoff, Mihael Milunovic, Robert Morris, Jean-Luc Nancy, Roman Opalka, Jean-Michel Othoniel, Patrick Othoniel, Bernard Pagès, Riccardo Panattoni, Claudio Parmiggiani, Anne et Patrick Poirier, Richard Price, Wu Qi, Bernard Rancillac, Sophie Ristelhueber, Jacques Roubaud, Sonia Rykiel, Sarkis, Saschienne, Gianluca Solla, Ettore Spalletti, Swoon, Agnès Thurnauer, David Tremlett, Nils-Udo, Claude Viallat, Bernar Venet, Dai Xiang.
