= 34th Reconnaissance Squadron (disambiguation) =

34th Reconnaissance Squadron may refer to:

- The 423d Bombardment Squadron, designated the 34th Reconnaissance Squadron (Heavy) from March 1942 to April 1942.
- The 34th Reconnaissance Squadron (Fighter), active from April 1943 to August 1943, but never fully manned or equipped.

== See also ==
- The 34th Photographic Reconnaissance Squadron
