= Charles Maynard =

Charlie or Charles Maynard may refer to:

== Public officials ==
- Charles Maynard (MP) (c.1598–1665), English Member of Parliament for Chippenham, 1624
- Charles Maynard, 1st Viscount Maynard (c.1690–1775), British peer who served as Lord Lieutenant of Suffolk
- Charles Maynard (Dominican politician) (1934–2012), cabinet minister and deputy prime minister
- Charles Maynard (Bahamian politician) (1970–2012), cabinet minister and member of parliament
- Charlie Maynard (born 1971), British politician, Liberal Democrat MP for Witney since 2024

== Others ==
- Charles Johnson Maynard (1845–1929), American naturalist and ornithologist
- Charles Maynard (British Army officer) (1870–1945), general in Second Boer War and First World War
- Charles Frederick Maynard (1897–1946), Aboriginal Australian activist in New South Wales
