= Robert Maynard (disambiguation) =

Robert Maynard (1684–1751) was a Royal Navy officer.

Robert Maynard may also refer to:

- Robert Maynard (toxicologist) (born 1951), British toxicologist
- Robert C. Maynard (1937–1993), American journalist, newspaper publisher and editor
- Robert Maynard Jr. (born 1962), American businessman
