= Meinhardt =

Meinhardt might refer to:

== Surname ==
- Maria Meinhardt (1847–c. 1921), Russian revolutionary
- Sven Meinhardt (born 1971), German former field hockey forward
- Gerek Meinhardt (born 1990), American foil fencer

== First name ==
- Meinhardt Schomberg, 3rd Duke of Schomberg (1641–1719), general in the service of Prince William of Orange
- Meinhardt Raabe (1915–2010), American actor

== See also ==
- Mainard
- Maynard (given name)
- Meinhard (disambiguation)
