= Mainard =

Mainard (also spelled Maynard) is an English and French given name derived from the Old High German form Maganhard, from magan (power, strength) and hart (strong, hard). The medieval German form is Meginhard; the modern form Meinhard. It is a distinct name from Meinrad.

The Dutch form of the name is Meindert. There are many Italian variants: Maghinardo, Maginardo, Meinardo, Mainardo and Mainardi.

== People ==
- Mainard (bishop of Turin), died 1117

== See also ==
- Dominique Mainard
- Maynard (surname)
