= Meinhard (disambiguation) =

Meinhard is a community in the Werra-Meißner-Kreis in Hesse, Germany. It is also a masculine Germanic given name.

Meinhard may refer to:

== Medieval people ==
- Saint Meinhard (12th-century–1196), bishop of Livonia
- Meinhard I, Count of Gorizia (died 1142)
- Meinhard II, Count of Gorizia (died 1231)
- Meinhard I, Count of Gorizia-Tyrol (died 1258)
- Meinhard, Duke of Carinthia (died 1295), also Count of Gorizia and Tyrol
- Meinhard III, Count of Gorizia-Tyrol (died 1363)
- Meinhard V, Count of Gorizia (died after 1318)
- Meinhard VI, Count of Gorizia (died 1385)

== Modern people ==
- Meinhard E. Mayer (1929–2011), Romanian professor of physics and mathematics at the University of California, Irvine
- Meinhard Nehmer (born 1941), retired East German bobsledder
- Meinhard Hemp (born 1942), retired German footballer

== See also ==
- Meinhardt (disambiguation)
- Mainard
- Maynard (given name)
