= Dori J. Maynard =

American journalism academic

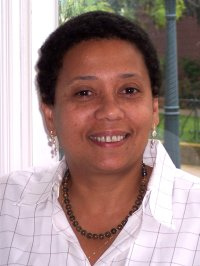
- Dori J. Maynard, 2008
- Born: Dori J. Maynard; May 4, 1958; New York City, New York, USA
- Died: February 24, 2015 (aged 56); Oakland, California, USA
- Education: Middlebury College; Harvard University
- Title: President and CEO
- Spouse(s): Charles Grant Lewis, deceased
- Website: http://www.mije.org

Dori J. Maynard (May 4, 1958 – February 24, 2015) was an American writer and journalist. She was the president of the Robert C. Maynard Institute for Journalism Education in Oakland, California, and the co-author of Letters to My Children, a compilation of nationally syndicated columns by her late father Robert C. Maynard, for which she wrote introductory essays.

== Career ==
Doris Judith Maynard was born in Brooklyn, New York, on May 4, 1958, to Elizabeth Rosen and Robert C. Maynard, a journalist and the later co-owner of The Oakland Tribune. Maynard was the only child of Elizabeth and Robert, who divorced in 1963. She spent some of her childhood in Washington, D.C., living with her father as he worked for the Washington Post. As a teenager, Maynard worked at a regional fast-food restaurant to earn money, and traveled to Africa before applying to college.

In 1982, Maynard graduated from Middlebury College in Vermont with a BA in American History. After graduating, she went on to report for The Patriot Ledger in Quincy, Massachusetts. In 1989, she moved to Detroit, and worked for the Detroit Free Press, where her reporting focused on politics and poverty. After receiving the prestigious Nieman Fellowship, a year-long journalism program at Harvard University, Maynard moved to the Boston area in 1992.

Maynard would later move to Oakland, California, where she reported for the Bakersfield Californian. In 1994, she began serving as the Special Projects Director for the Robert C. Maynard Institute for Journalism Education, a nonprofit organization co-founded by her father and step-mother that aims to improve diversity in journalism. She became the president and CEO of the Institute in 2001, where she remained until her death in 2015.

After her father's death in 1993, she edited and published a posthumous collection of his newspaper columns with introductory essays by herself, titled Letters to My Children.

Maynard served on the board of the Society of Professional Journalists' Sigma Delta Chi Foundation beginning in 1999, which renamed their Diversity Leadership Program after her in 2015. She was also a board member of the American Society of News Editors, where she was posthumously recognized with a scholarship through the John S. and James L. Knight Foundation.

== Accolades ==
When she received the Neiman fellowship in 1993, she and her father became the first father-daughter duo to be named Nieman fellows, as her father had earned the accomplishment in 1966.

She received the "Fellow of Society" award, which recognizes outstanding contributions to the journalism field, from the Society of Professional Journalists at the national convention in Seattle, Washington, on October 6, 2001, and was voted one of the "10 Most Influential African Americans in the Bay Area" in 2004 by CityFlight Media Network.

In 2008, she received the Asian American Journalists Association's Leadership in Diversity Award.

== Personal life ==
Maynard was the only child of her parents, who divorced in 1962. Her father would later remarry Nancy Alene Hicks Maynard, the first African-American female to work as a reporter at The New York Times. She has two step-brothers, David and Alex Maynard, and a half-sister, Sara-Ann Rosen.

In 2006, she married Charles Grant Lewis, a local architect in Oakland. Lewis died in 2008 after being diagnosed with a brain tumor.

On February 24, 2015, at the age of 56, Maynard died from complications of lung cancer.
