= Ralphsmith =

Ralphsmith is a surname. Notable people with the surname include:

- Hugo Ralphsmith (born 2001), Australian rules footballer for Richmond
- Sean Ralphsmith (born 1966), Australian rules footballer for Hawthorn and St Kilda

== See also ==
- Ralph Smith (disambiguation)
