= John Maynard =

John Maynard may refer to:

== Politicians ==
- John Maynard (MP for St Albans) (1509–1556), English MP for St Albans, 1553–1554
- John Maynard (died 1658) (1592–1658), English politician, MP for Lostwithiel, 1646
- John Maynard (1604–1690), English lawyer and politician, MP for Totnes 1640–1653, Plymouth 1656,1679–1685,1689,1690, Bere Alston 1661, 1685 and others
- John Maynard (died 1662) (1638–1662), English MP for Bere Alston, 1660
- John Maynard (New York politician) (1786–1850), U.S. Representative from New York

== Other people ==
- John Maynard (cricketer), West Indian cricketer
- John Maynard (civil servant) (1865–1943), British civil servant and political activist
- John Maynard (composer) (born 1570), English madrigalist
- John Maynard (film producer), Australian filmmaker, founder of Arenafilms
- John Maynard (historian), Australian historian, grandson of Aboriginal jockey Merv Maynard
- Luther Fuller, also known as John Maynard, helmsman of the steamboat Erie

== Literature ==
- "John Maynard", poem by Horatio Alger, about the helmsman Luther Fuller
- "John Maynard", poem by Theodor Fontane, about the helmsman Luther Fuller

== See also ==
- John Maynard Keynes, British economist
- John Maynard Smith (1920–2004), British theoretical evolutionary biologist and geneticist
