= Nancy Hicks Maynard =

American journalist and publisher (1946–2008)

- Born: Nancy Alene Hall; November 1, 1946; Harlem, New York City, USA
- Died: September 21, 2008 (aged 61)
- Education: Long Island University
- Known for: Maynard Institute co-founder
- Notable credit(s): The New York Times; The Washington Post; The Oakland Tribune
- Spouse(s): Robert C. Maynard (1975–1993†); Daniel D. Hicks (1965–1974†)
- Partner: Jay T. Harris
- Children: Dori J., David and Alex

Nancy Alene Hicks Maynard (November 1, 1946 – September 21, 2008) was an American publisher, journalist, former owner of The Oakland Tribune, and co-founder of the Maynard Institute for Journalism Education. She was the first African-American female reporter for The New York Times, and at the time of her death, The Oakland Tribune was the only metropolitan daily newspaper to have been owned by African Americans. She was a pioneering advocate for diversifying newsrooms.

== Early life ==
Maynard was born Nancy Alene Hall in Harlem, New York City, to jazz bassist Alfred Hall and Eve Keller, a nurse. Maynard first became interested in journalism when, after a fire destroyed the elementary school she once attended, she was unhappy with the portrayal of her community in the coverage by the news media. She went on to attend Long Island University Brooklyn and graduated with a journalism degree in 1966.

== Career ==
=== The New York Times ===
Maynard began her journalism career as a copy girl and reporter with the New York Post. She was hired by The New York Times in September 1968, at the age of 21. Almost immediately, she was sent to Brooklyn to help cover the Ocean Hill-Brownsville school decentralization controversy, which drew accusations of racism and anti-Semitism and resulted in a citywide teachers' strike and the establishment of new school districts throughout the city. After less than one year at the Times, Maynard was hired as a full-time reporter, becoming the first African-American woman to work as a reporter at the newspaper.

During her first few years at The New York Times, Maynard covered important race-related stories such as race riots and Columbia and Cornell University black student takeovers, as well as politically significant events like a memorial for Robert F. Kennedy. She later wrote for the paper's education and science news departments, primarily on health-care coverage. In 1973, she spent a month in China analyzing its medical system, including stories about the use of acupuncture in surgical operations. Among her other story topics were the Medicare system, an explanation of the arrangement of whiskers on a lion's face, and coverage of the Apollo program.

=== Maynard Institute for Journalism Education ===
Maynard and her husband left their jobs and founded the Maynard Institute for Journalism Education in Oakland, California, where she served as its first president in 1977. In 1978, she was also a professor of journalism at the University of Michigan. Since its founding, the institute has been credited with training and preparing hundreds of minority students for careers in news editing, newsroom managers, and other careers in journalism. Maynard served as a member of the board until 2002.

=== The Oakland Tribune ===
In 1983, Maynard and her husband purchased The Oakland Tribune, which was in poor financial shape at the time. The Oakland Tribune became the first and, at the time of Maynard's death, the only major metropolitan daily newspaper to be owned by African Americans. The two served as co-publishers for almost 10 years together, and were credited with bringing a significant amount of diversity into the newsroom. After Robert C. Maynard died in 1993, Maynard sold the paper, which was experiencing declining revenues, to ANG Newspapers.

== Personal life ==
Not long after graduation, Maynard was married to Daniel D. Hicks, with whom she had her first child, her son David. After Hicks's death in 1974, she married Robert C. Maynard in 1975 after they met at a convention. He already had a daughter, Dori. As a couple, they had their third child, Alex. Robert Maynard died in 1993, having been suffering with prostate cancer. Maynard subsequently concentrated on consulting and book publishing.

Maynard, who made her home with partner Jay T. Harris in Santa Monica, California, died at UCLA Medical Center in Los Angeles in 2008 at the age of 61, after an extended illness.

== See also ==
- Women in journalism and media professions

== Bibliography ==
- Managing the Future of News and Information (First ed.). New York: Freedom Forum Media Studies Center. 1994. OCLC 33996966.
- Mega Media: How Market Forces Are Transforming News (First ed.). New York: Maynard Partners Inc. 2000. ISBN 0-9701292-0-3.
