= Darby McCarthy =

Australian jockey (1944–2020)

Richard Laurence "Darby" McCarthy
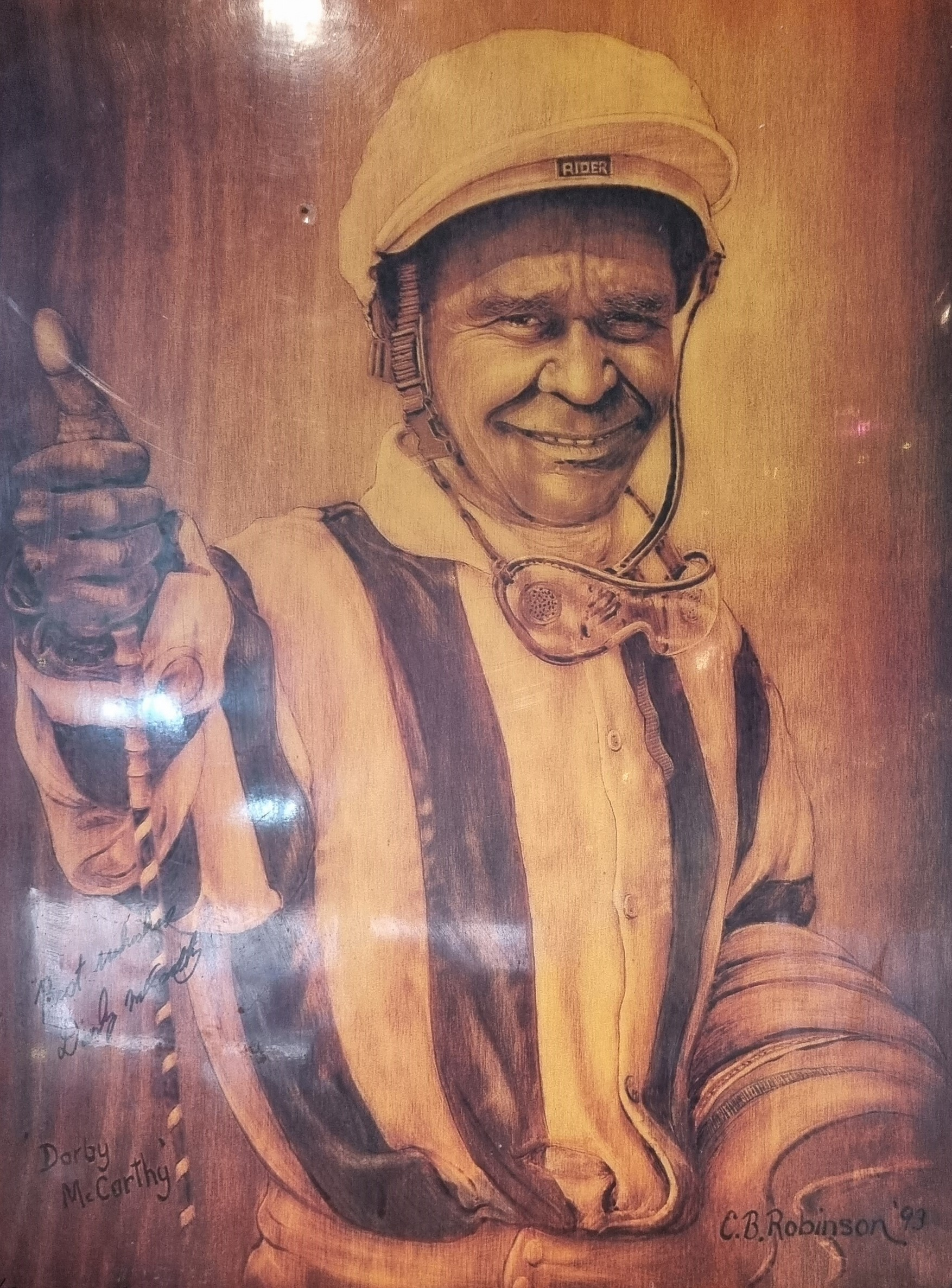
- Painting by C.B Robinson 1993
- Born: 1944; Cunnamulla, Queensland, Australia
- Died: 6 May 2020 (aged 75–76)
- Occupation: Jockey
- Honors: OAM

Richard Laurence "Darby" McCarthy OAM (1944 – 6 May 2020) was an Australian Indigenous jockey.

== Early life ==
McCarthy was born in a sandhills camp at Cunnamulla in Queensland, the son of Albert and Kate, who married at 13.

== Career ==
He became one of Australia's best jockeys in the 1950s and 60s, and did much to further the Aboriginal cause.

Olympian runner Cathy Freeman said of him:

Darby influenced me and encouraged me to strive for excellence in all that I do and to persevere against all odds and for this I will forever be thankful... We first met in Queensland when I was 15 and Darby and his family were kind enough to let me stay on weekends away from boarding school at Toowoomba. (quoted in Against All Odds)

McCarthy raced frequently in Brisbane, where his records include three Stradbrokes, the Brisbane Cup and the Doomben 10,000 before he moved to Sydney.

He won the 1969 AJC Derby on Divide And Rule and the Epsom with Broker's Tip on the same day.

McCarthy then went on to race in Europe, including at Royal Ascot and in Paris, before a brief retirement and further riding in New Caledonia.

He was inducted into the Queensland Racing Hall of Fame during the Industry Awards Night held in Brisbane, July 2004.

== Death ==
McCarthy died on 6 May 2020, aged 76.
