= Oakland Tribune =

Weekly newspaper in Oakland, California

- The July 27, 2005 front page of The Oakland Tribune
- Type: Daily newspaper
- Format: Broadsheet
- Owner: Digital First Media
- Founder(s): George Staniford; Benet A. Dewes
- Publisher: Sharon Ryan
- Editor: Bert Robinson
- Founded: February 21, 1874; 152 years ago
- Ceased publication: 2016
- Language: English
- ISSN: 1068-5936
- OCLC number: 760300116
- Website: eastbaytimes.com/oakland
- Free online archives: California Digital Newspaper Collection

The Oakland Tribune was a daily newspaper published in Oakland, California, from 1874 until 2016 when it was merged into the East Bay Times by its owner, Bay Area News Group. The former nameplate of the consolidated newspaper continues to be published every Friday as weekly community supplements.

== History ==
=== Origin ===
On February 21, 1874, the Oakland Daily Tribune was founded by editor George Staniford and printer Benet "Ben" A. Dewes. At that time the competition was the Oakland News and Oakland Transcript. The paper's first editorial stated, "There seems to be an open field for a journal like the Tribune in Oakland, and we accordingly proceed to occupy it, presenting the Tribune, which is intended to be a permanent daily paper, deriving its support solely from advertising patronage."

That August, Staniford sold his half interest to Dewes. The paper's office moved to 911 Broadway in January 1875. A.B. Gibson joined Dewes as co-owner in February 1876. The partnership soon dissolved and A. E. Nightingill bought a half-interest.

=== The Dargie family era (1876-1915) ===
In July 1876, Dewes sold the Oakland Daily Evening Tribune to William E. Dargie, a former student at the University of California at Berkeley. He soon secured wire service dispatches from the Associated Press for the paper. Darige also bought Nightingill's stake, although his widow disputed the transaction having ever occurred.

Under Dargie's management, the paper increased in size, circulation and influence. The Republican paper became the leading news publication in Alameda County.On August 28, 1891, the name The Oakland Tribune was officially adopted.

In the early 1900s, Dargie hired a one-eyed lensman Jack Gunin, making him probably the first full-time photojournalist in the Western United States.

=== The Knowland family era (1911-1975) ===
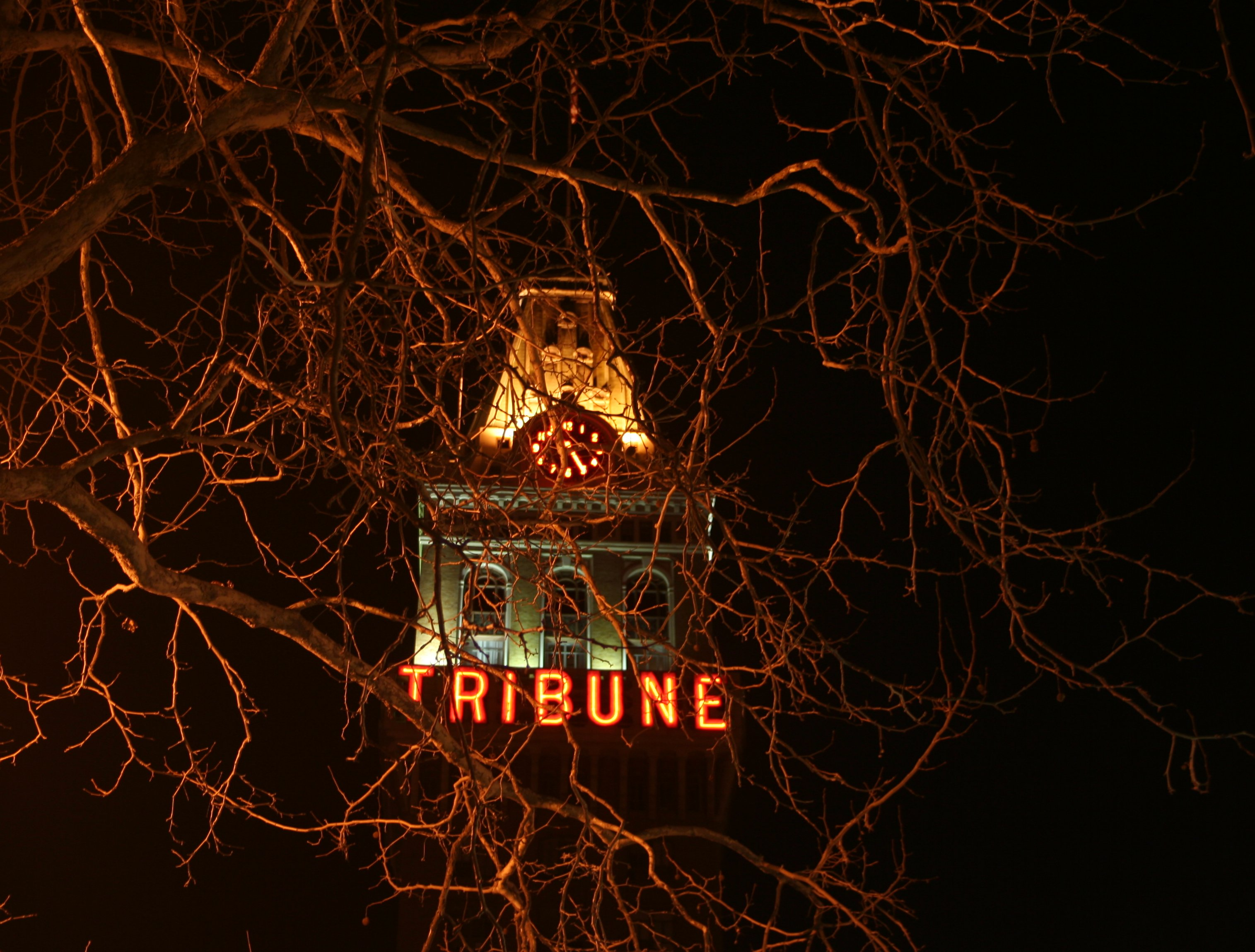
The Tribune Building was the headquarters of the Oakland Tribune from 1924 until 2007.

In 1911, Dargie died. His widow Hermina Peralta Dargie then operated the Tribune until 1915 when Joseph R. Knowland bought a half-interest. Knowland moved the Tribune to a new location at 13th and Franklin streets on March 25, 1918. Knowland started the radio station KLX in 1922, and in 1923 completed Tribune Tower, a 20 story building which would house his newspaper and radio station. In 1929, Mrs. Dargie died, and bequested an estate worth $1 million.

In 1935, Knowland named his son Joseph Russell "Russ" Knowland, Jr. as assistant publisher, and in 1957 he became general manager. In 1960, Knowland named his other son, assistant publisher William F. Knowland, to succeed him as editor. In 1961, Russ Knowland died of a heart attack.

In 1966, Joseph R. Knowland died at the age of 92. In 1974, the Tribune celebrated its 100th birthday. Two days after the centennial celebration, William F. Knowland committed suicide. The Los Angeles Times later reported he was $900,000 debt with the bank loans due a few weeks after he fatally shot himself. On the death of his father, Joseph William Knowland became the Tribune's editor and publisher, and in 1975 the California Press Association named him "Publisher of the Year."

=== CCC, Gannett and Maynard (1977-1992) ===
In 1977, the Knowland family sold the Oakland Tribune for $15.8 million to Combined Communications Corporation of Arizona, which owned The Cincinnati Enquirer, seven television stations, six radio stations and 10 outdoor advertising companies. Karl Eller was president and CEO of the company, which merged with Gannett in June 1979. That October, Robert C. Maynard was then hired as the Tribune's first African-American editor.

A month later Gannett CEO Allen H. Neuharth launched East Bay Today, a morning edition of the Tribune, an afternoon paper, and was sold at only retailers in Oakland. The pilot project served as an early prototype of Gannett's later national paper USA Today. The Tribune was merged into East Bay Today in September 1982. Around that time Gannett purchased KRON-TV. The company then had due sell the Tribune as federal anti-trust laws made it illegal to own a television station and a newspaper in the same geographical market.

In 1983, Gannet sold the paper to Maynard and his wife Nancy Hicks Maynard for $22 million. At that time the paper had a circulation of 174,000. Maynard used the real estate assets of the Tribune as collateral for a $17 million loan from Gannett used to fund the purchase. The deal was the first management-led leveraged buyout of a newspaper in the United States.

The Tribune faced financial difficulties and was close to shuttering. In 1991, the Freedom Forum, a nonprofit founded by Neuharth, agreed to provide the paper the means to wipe out its $31.5 million debt owed to Gannett, in addition to funds to help cover operating expenses. It was the first time in the nation a nonprofit organization bailed out a major for-profit publication.

=== MediaNews Group (1992-2016) ===
Circulation continued to decline and Maynard, then age 55, soon began a series of radiation treatments for prostate cancer. In 1992, the Maynards sold the Tribune for $10 million to Alameda Newspaper Group, a subsidiary of the Denver-based MediaNews Group. Around 380 employees were laid off. Tribune Tower, the paper's office, was not included in the sale. Maynard died in 1993, and in 1997 was posthumously inducted into the California Newspaper Hall of Fame.

In 2006, ANG's name was changed to Bay Area News Group after the acquisition of The Mercury News and Contra Costa Times from McClatchy Co. In 2007, the Tribune moved out of Tribune Tower to new offices on Oakport Street.

In 2011, BANG announced a plan to merge the Tribune with other sister East Bay newspapers, but on October 27, 2011, BANG announced that it would retain The Oakland Tribune masthead. In 2012, the Tribune moved its offices to 1970 Broadway in Oakland's Uptown district.

On April 4, 2016, the last daily edition of the Tribune was published as it was combined with other BANG-owned East Bay papers the Contra Costa Times, Hayward Daily Review and Fremont Argus, The Alameda Journal under the new East Bay Times nameplate.

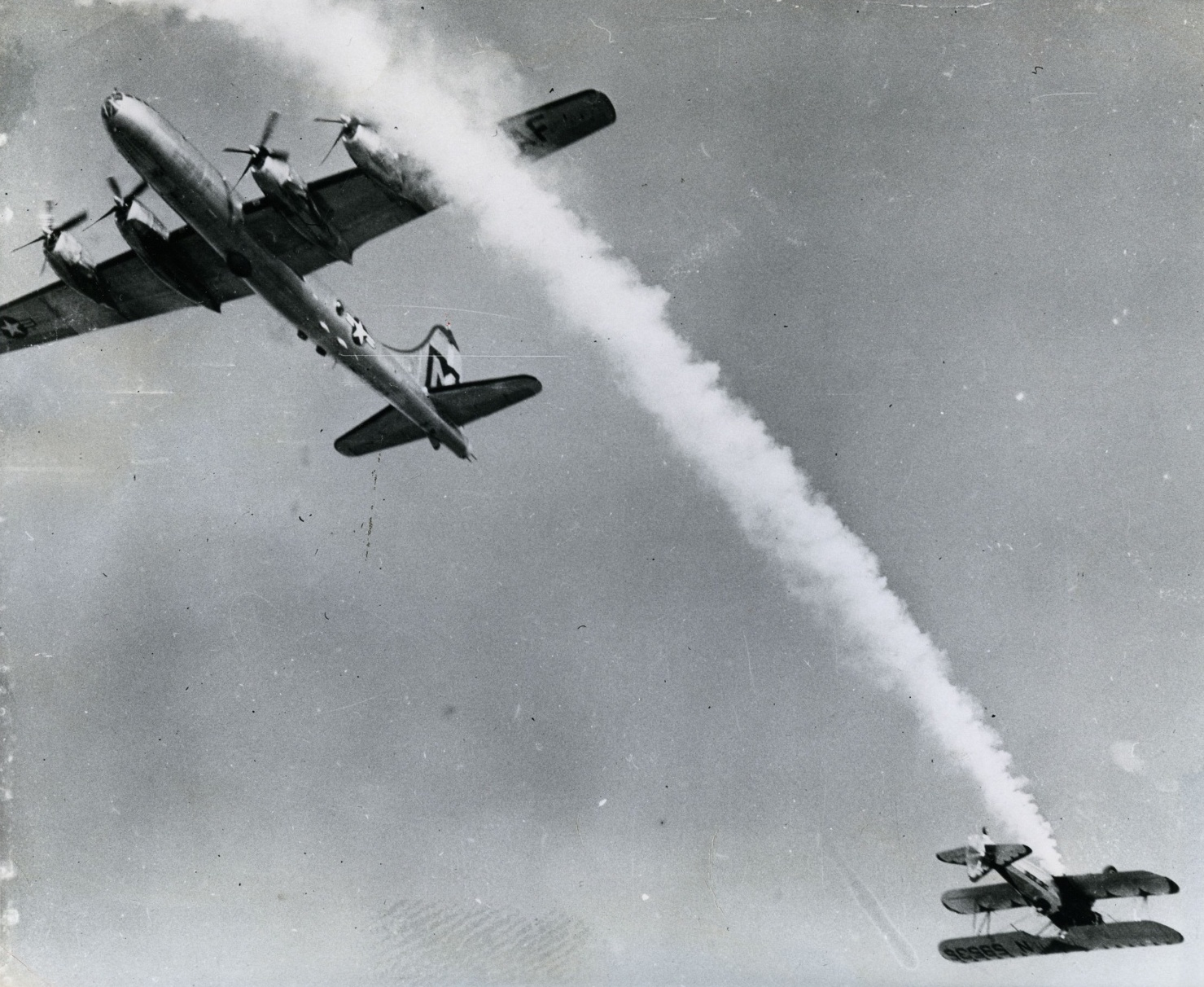
"Near Collision at Air Show", the Pulitzer Prize-winning work by Tribune photographer Bill Crouch

== Pulitzer Prizes ==
The Oakland Tribune won the Pulitzer Prize for a photograph of a small private plane narrowly missing a B-29 Superfortress in 1950, and again for photographs of the aftermath of the October 17, 1989, Loma Prieta earthquake.
