= Justice Maynard =

Justice Maynard may refer to:

- Isaac H. Maynard (1838–1896), judge of the New York Court of Appeals, the highest court in New York
- John Maynard (New York politician) (1786–1850), justice of the New York Supreme Court and ex officio a judge of the New York Court of Appeals, the highest court in New York
- Spike Maynard (1942–2014), associate justice of the Supreme Court of Appeals of West Virginia
