= Maria Leshern von Herzfeld =

Russian revolutionary (1847–1921)

- Мария Лешерн фон Герцфельд
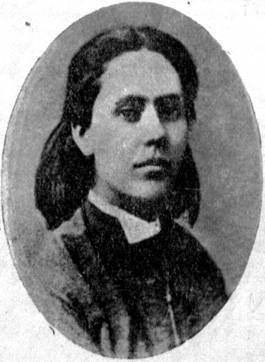
- Leshern von Herzfeld (1882)
- Born: Maria Pavlovna Meinhardt; 1847; Tver, Russian Empire
- Died: c. 1921 (aged 73–74); Nizhny Novgorod, Russian SFSR
- Organization: Land and Liberty
- Movement: Narodniks
- Spouse: Aleksandr Leshern von Herzfeld (m. 1868; div. 1871)
- Partner: Aleksandr Ivanchin-Pisarev
- Relatives: Anna Pribyleva-Korba (sister)
- Family: Meinhardt

Maria Pavlovna Leshern von Herzfeld (née Meinhardt; Russian: Мария Павловна Лешерн фон Герцфельд; 1847 – c. 1921) was a Russian Narodnik revolutionary. After an early life of domesticity, she moved to Switzerland with the revolutionary Aleksandr Ivanchin-Pisarev, who would become her husband. As a Narodnik, she organised the prison escape of Peter Kropotkin and participated in revolutionary settlements in the Ural region. After the assassination of Alexander II of Russia, Ivanchin-Pisarev was arrested and exiled to Minusinsk, in Siberia. Leshern von Herzfeld followed him there clandestinely, before giving herself up to the authorities, who allowed her to return to exile in Minusinsk to reunite with her husband. Her memoirs were collected by the historical magazine Byloye and became a key primary source on the Narodniks.

== Biography ==
Maria Pavlovna Meinhardt was born in 1847. She was the older sister of Anna Pribyleva-Korba. After an early life of homeschooling, she married the railway engineer Aleksandr Leshern von Herzfeld, with whom she had a child and later divorced. In the mid-1870s, she moved to Switzerland with Aleksandr Ivanchin-Pisarev, with whom she entered into a common-law marriage.

By this time, she had become involved in the revolutionary activities of the Narodniks. In June 1876, she helped organise the prison escape of the Narodnik revolutionary Peter Kropotkin, who managed to flee abroad and subsequently became a famous theorist of anarchism. By 1877, Leshern von Herzfeld had herself returned to Russia, where she joined the Narodnik organisation Land and Liberty. Together with Evgenia Figner, she travelled to the Ural region and settled in Buzuluk district of the Samara province.

Under the assumed name of Maria Lebedintseva, she took up work as an accountant in the village of Strakhovo, where she lived together with Ivanchin-Pisarev, pretending to be his sister. There she was active in Narodnik agitation among the peasantry, as part of the "Going to the People" movement. On 30 December 1877, she fled the village, after receiving news that one of her comrades had been arrested. Taking the new name of Maria Govorova, in May 1878, she settled in the Volsky district of Saratov province, where she lived in the villages of Bulgakovka and Baltay.

When her false passport was demanded for registration, on 13 March 1879, Leshern von Herzfeld and Ivanchin-Pisarev fled Saratov. After their flight, Ivanchin-Pisarev became disillusioned with the possibility of legalitarian activism and joined the Narodnaya Volya organisation. He was arrested following the assassination of Alexander II, while Leshern von Herzfeld herself managed to escape arrest. She went to Saint Petersburg clandestinely, in order to establish contact with Ivanchin-Pisarev.

On 8 July 1881, she was sentenced to death in absentia for participation in a criminal organisation, but the case against her was suspended until she could be found. When Ivanchin-Pisarev was deported to Minusinsk, she secretly followed him there and they lived together clandestinely for almost a year. On 26 May 1882, she gave herself up to the authorities. She was immediately arrested and sent to Saint Petersburg, but was bailed out by her brother-in-law Aleksandr Stange. In poor health, she moved to the resort city of Sochi. The following year, the authorities ordered her to be deported to a place of her choice; she chose to return to Minusinsk and reunite with Ivanchin-Pisarev. Biographical information about Leshern von Herzfeld's life after 1883 has not yet been found.

== Legacy ==
Leshern von Herzfeld's memoirs were collected by Pavel Shchegolev, one of the editors of the historical magazine Byloye. In 1921, Byloye published a section of Leshern von Herzfeld's memoirs, which revealed her role in Kropotkin's escape from prison. Her younger sister Anna's memoirs were published in 1925, but made no mention of her revolutionary activities. In 2016, Leshern von Herzfeld's memoirs of the "Going to the People" were published by the Saint Petersburg Institute of History. Her memoirs have since provided a key primary source on the Narodniks, complementing other memoirs written by Narodniks during the same period.

== Bibliography ==
- Kon, Feliks, ed. (1933). "Лешерн-фон-Герцфельдт Мария Павловна" [Leshern-von-Herzfeld Maria Pavlovna]. Actors of the revolutionary movement in Russia (in Russian). Society of Former Political Prisoners and Exiled Settlers. pp. 771–772. OCLC 1277040591.
- Ginev, V.N. (2016). "Воспоминания М.П. Лешерн фон Герцфельд о народнической пропаганде среди крестьян Самарской и Саратовской губерний в 1877–1879 гг" [Memoirs of M.P. Leshern von Herzfeld about the Narodnik propaganda among the peasants of Samara and Saratov provinces in 1877-1879] (PDF). Trudy (in Russian). 2 (18). Saint Petersburg Institute of History: 377–427. ISBN 978-5-4469-0997-1. OCLC 978507828.
