= Robert Maynard (toxicologist) =

British toxicologist

Professor Robert Maynard CBE FRCP FRCPath FFOM
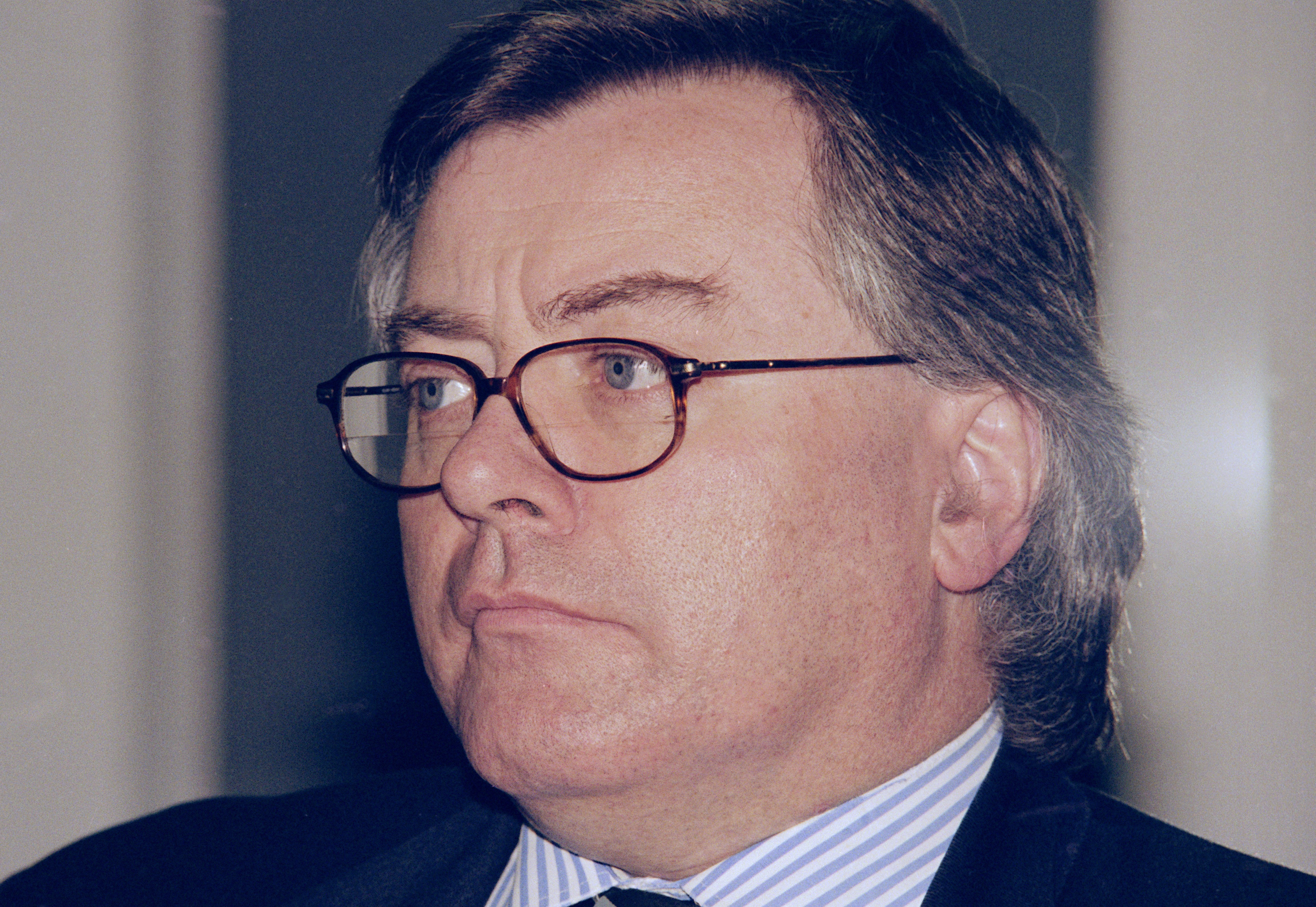
- Maynard in March 2002
- Born: Robert Lewis Maynard; 1951 (age 74–75)
- Occupation: Toxicologist

Robert Lewis Maynard (born 1951) is a British toxicologist.

Maynard was head of the air pollution unit at the United Kingdom Department of Health from 1990 to 2011.

He served as editor of the World Health Organization's Air Quality Guidelines for Europe.

He became an Honorary Professor in the Institute of Public Health at the University of Birmingham in 2000.

He was made a Commander of the Order of the British Empire (CBE) in the 2000 New Year Honours.
