= Bruno Maynard =

French ice hockey forward

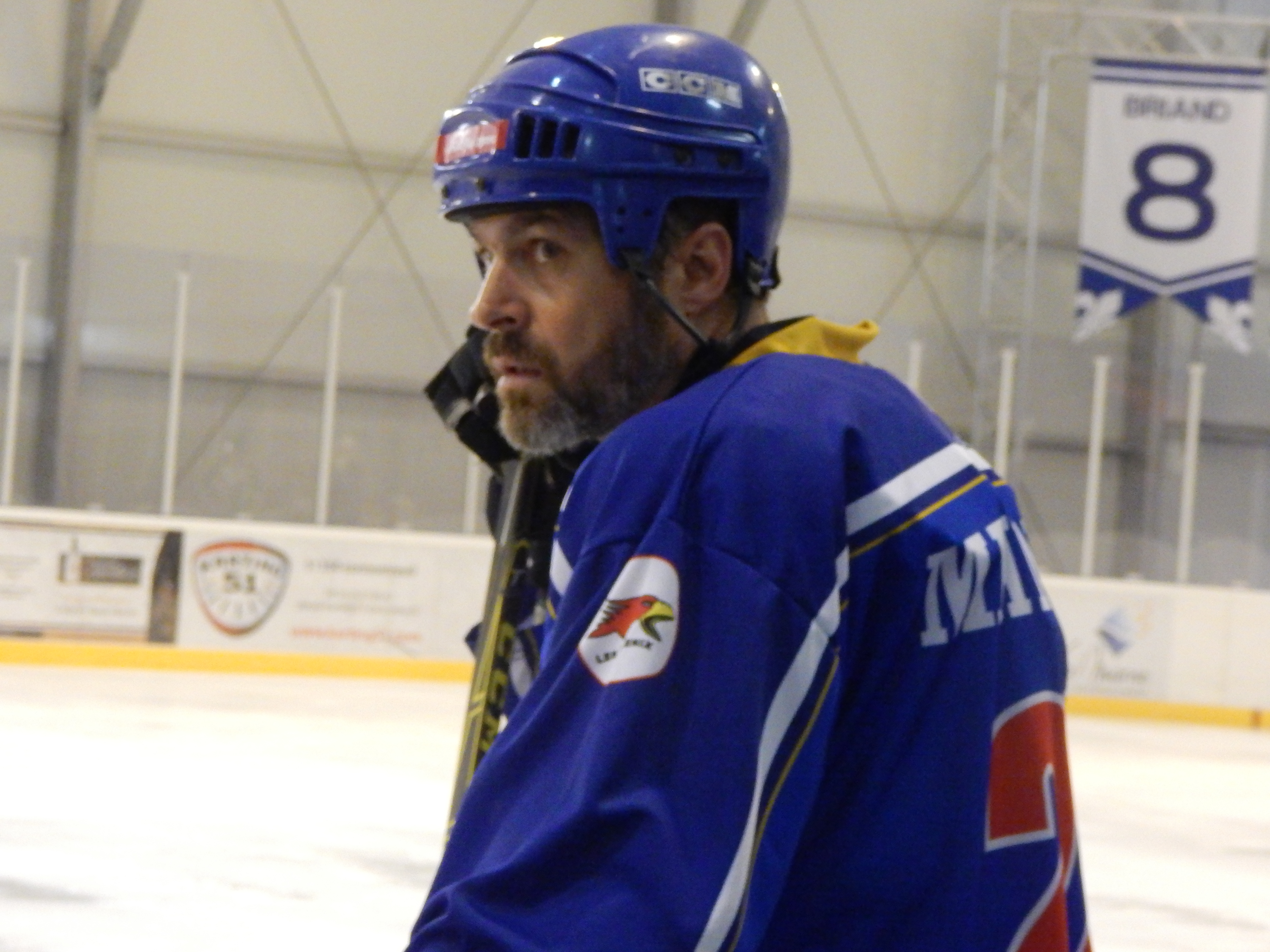
- Maynard in 2018
- Born: 25 February 1971 (age 54); Chamonix, France
- Height: 6 ft 0 in (183 cm)
- Weight: 176 lb (80 kg; 12 st 8 lb)
- Position: Defence/Forward
- Shot: Left
- Played for: Yétis du Mont-Blanc; Hockey Club de Reims; Brûleurs de Loups; Chamonix HC; Ours de Villard-de-Lans; Dragons de Rouen; Brest Albatros Hockey
- National team: France
- Playing career: 1988–2013

Bruno Maynard (born 25 February 1971) is a French former professional ice hockey player. He is currently the general manager of Corsaires de Nantes of the FFHG Division 1.

Maynard played for Yétis du Mont-Blanc, Hockey Club de Reims, Brûleurs de Loups, Chamonix HC, Ours de Villard-de-Lans, Dragons de Rouen and Brest Albatros Hockey. He also played in the 1993 World Ice Hockey Championships for the France national team.
