= Merv Maynard =

Aboriginal Australian jockey (C.1931–2017)

- Born: Mervyn Maynard c. 1931; Sydney, Australia
- Died: 1994 (aged 85)
- Occupation: Jockey
- Spouse: Judith Middleton
- Children: John Maynard
- Parents: Fred Maynard (father); Minnie Critchley (mother)

Mervyn "Merv" Maynard (c. 1931 – 9 April 2017) was an Aboriginal Australian jockey who rode numerous winners in a career spanning almost five decades.

== Early life ==
Mervyn Maynard was born around 1931, the son of Aboriginal activist Fred Maynard and Minnie Critchley, an Englishwoman, whose father was a miner. His early life was difficult, owing to his father being under police surveillance because of his political activism, and the children were the targets of death threats. On one occasion, Mervyn and another Aboriginal boy were picked up by police and taken to the police station, which terrified him.

His father died when Merv was still a teenager (in 1946). Merv began working in a pharmacy in the western Sydney suburb of Lakemba, where he washed bottles, then got a job making deliveries for the local post office.

== Career ==
=== Summary ===
Maynard's career spanned 46 years, in which he rode over 1,500 winning horses, across four countries: Australia, New Zealand, Singapore and Malaysia, between 1949 and 1994. He won the Newcastle Jockey Club premiership twice, and rode a winning horse in every year that he rode between 1948 and 1994. These included 18 country cup victories in New South Wales. In the 1950s, trainer Tommy Smith picked him as a rider, and he rode in the Melbourne Cup in 1952. Among other famous owners, he rode for Frank Packer, and was just beaten in a photo finish in the 1951 Epsom Handicap. Later in his career, he had several big wins at Randwick Racecourse, including the AJC Shorts Handicap and AJC Canonbury Stakes.

During his career he rode against great Australian jockeys such as Lester Piggott, Darby Munro, Billy Cook, Scobie Breasley, and many others.

=== Apprenticeship and early years ===
When visiting aunts and uncles in Newcastle, he started frequenting Broadmeadow Racecourse, in the suburb of Broadmeadow, and then, back home in Lakemba, the Canterbury Park Racecourse. He was noticed by trainer Keith Tinson and offered an apprenticeship at Newcastle after spending a day looking after Tinson's horses. During his year-long apprenticeship, he worked seven days a week, starting at 3am.

Maynard enjoyed his first success in the 1948–1949 season at Newcastle, winning eight races. The following season he won 10.

In July 1951, apprentice Maynard was heading for a win in the Doomben 10,000 on Waratah King when the horse came down, and he was thrown. Coniston went on to win the race.

In 1952 Maynard won the Queen's Cup at Randwick Racecourse. Maynard was aged just 19 at the time, and won the race in a surprise win, on an outsider called Salamanca. The race had been expected to be a contest between the two favourites, Hydrogen and Dalray, champion horses both ridden by experienced jockeys, Keith Nuttal and Darby Munro. Maynard's only regret was that he did not get to meet the then Princess Elizabeth, later Queen Elizabeth II, who was, with husband Prince Philip, Duke of Edinburgh, scheduled to hand out the trophies at the event. However, en route to their Australian engagements, the couple were visiting several African countries, and it was there that they received the news of the death of her father, George VI, so they had to return to England. The young princess would remember the win, however, and on a state visit forty years later asked to be introduced to Maynard.

Also in 1952, Maynard rode Ocean Spray in the Caulfield Cup.

Around this time, when he was still under 21, he received an offer from brothers Run Run Shaw and Run Me Shaw, to be their stable jockey in Singapore and British Malaya. He wanted to accept, but the Australian Jockey Club told him that they would not issue him with an Australian jockey's licence if he went.

He continued to ride in Australia, and developed a special relationship with the horse Alinga (a name derived from Aboriginal mythology, a kind of sun goddess), winning 19 country races on the black gelding before starting to race him on the big city circuits. Alinga soon won some important races and became a favourite in some, including as equal favourite with Hydrogen in Brisbane (although did not win that one). In October 1953 Alinga broke his leg and after a couple of weeks of trying to save his life, the horse was destroyed under the direction of the RSPCA. Shortly after this, Maynard turned down a lucrative offer from a prestigious Melbourne stables, instead electing to ride the country cup circuit for many years, where he racked up numerous wins, possibly achieving a NSW record.

=== Riding abroad ===
In 1958, he accepted an offer from New Zealand trainer Larry Wiggins, and rode there for around a year, including for trainer George Green and owner American millionaire John de Blois Wack. After returning in 1959 he took up the city circuit again, winning his second premiership at Newcastle in 1960 and a number of other important races.

He rode in Singapore and Malaysia for four years, where he was accompanied by his wife Judy, after accepting to ride for trainer Keith Daniels. There he won the Penang and Sultan's Cups, and rode winning horses for the Sultan of Johor, before returning to Australia in 1964.

Judy was granted a trainer's licence in 1981, unusual for a woman in those days. However, Merv had a setback in 1982 when he was badly injured in a fall and trampled by a horse. Being extremely fit for a 50-year-old, he soon recovered and was back in the saddle three months later, and continued to ride winners for another 10 years.

== Later life and death ==
Maynard finally retired from race riding on 1 August 1994, aged 62, but continued to ride in trackwork for several more years.

Merv and Judy Maynard had a son, historian and academic John Maynard (of the Purai Global Indigenous History Centre at Newcastle University), and five grandchildren. Merv and fellow Aboriginal jockey and Hall of Fame inductee, Darby McCarthy, passed on his love of horseracing to John, who has researched the topic and written about Aboriginal horsemanship.

Merv Maynard died on 9 April 2017, aged 85.

== Recognition ==
On 22 February 1992, Maynard met Queen Elizabeth II at Randwick, by her request, along with Prince Philip. She wanted to win the winning jockey of the first Queen's Cup, and they chatted about horses and racing for about 40 minutes.

Maynard was inducted into the Aboriginal and Islander Sports Hall of Fame, an honour which he regarded as his greatest achievement.

Upon his death, obituaries were published in Newcastle Herald and other outlets.

in NAIDOC Week 2020, Racing.com featured Maynard along with four other "Indigenous Australians who have left their mark on racing": Darby McCarthy, Frank Reys, Leigh-Ann Goodwin, and Rod Bynder.
