= 423d Bombardment Squadron =

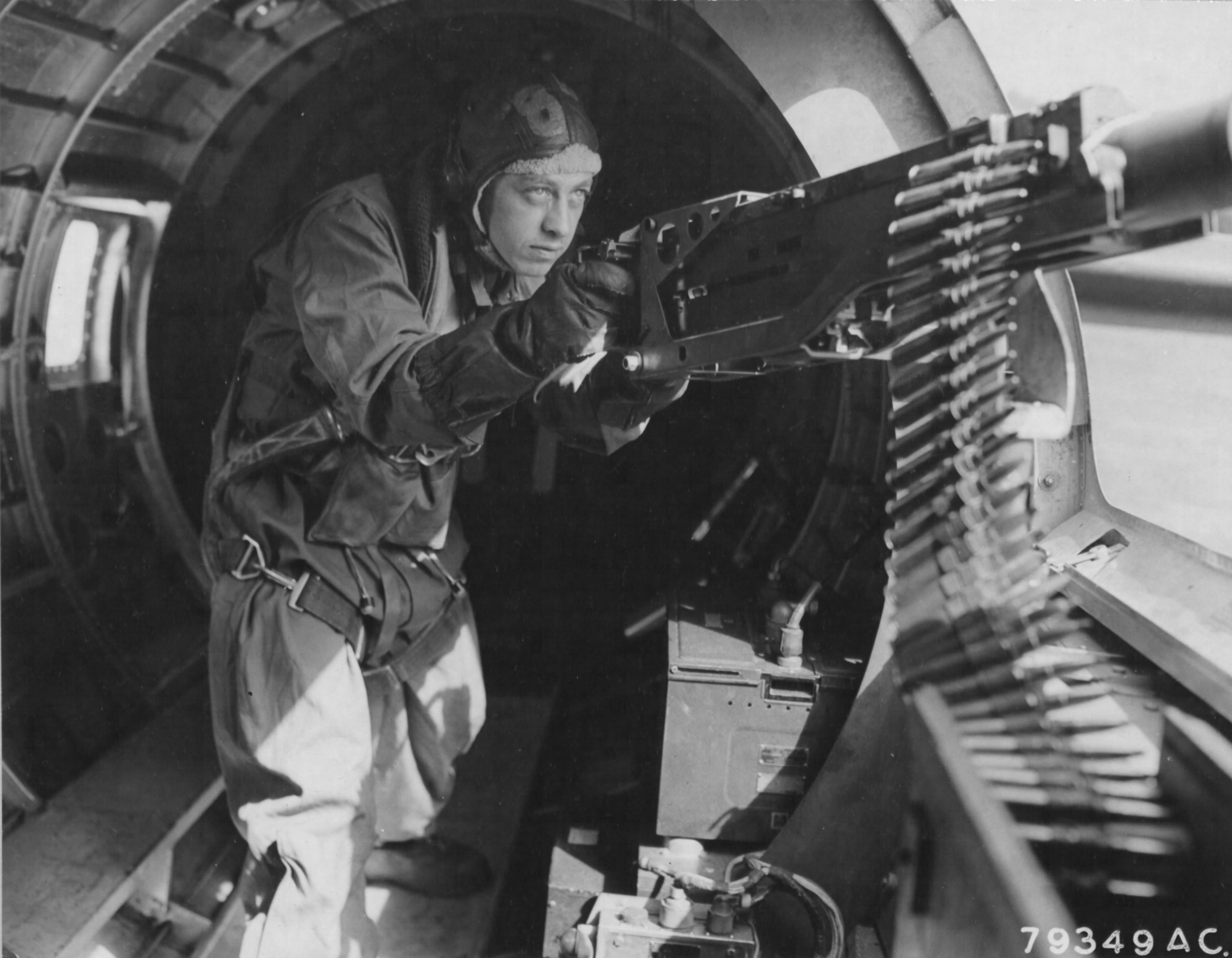
- S/Sgt Maynard Harrison Smith was a ball turret gunner with the 423d Bomb Squadron. He earned the Medal of Honor on 1 May 1943 mission to bomb submarine pens in Saint-Nazaire, France.
- Active: 1942–1946; 1953–1954; 1958–1962
- Country: United States
- Branch: United States Air Force
- Role: Bombardment
- Motto: Impedimus Hostes (Latin for 'We Check the Adversary') (1961-1962)
- Engagements: European Theater of World War II
- Decorations: Distinguished Unit Citation

Insignia
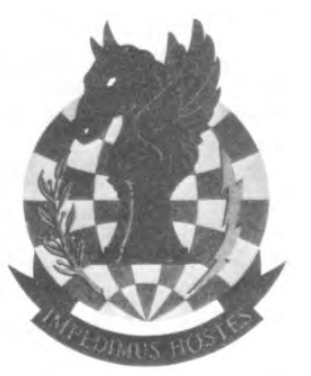
- 423d Bombardment Squadron emblem (Note: Approved 27 January 1961. Description: On and over a globe checky light blue and Air Force blue, a red winged chess knight in profile, highlights and details Air Force golden yellow, nostril and eye white between in dexter an olive branch arched and in sinister a lightning flash arched, Air Force golden yellow, shaded golden brown.)

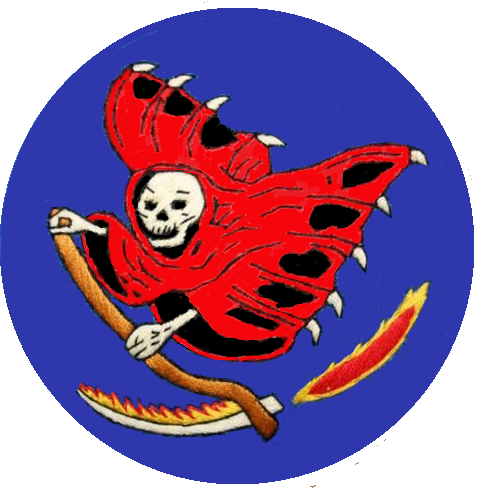
- 423d Bombardment Squadron (World War II)
- World War II squadron fuselage code: RD
- World War II group tail marking: Triangle H

The 423d Bombardment Squadron is an inactive United States Air Force unit. Its last assignment was with the 306th Bombardment Wing at MacDill Air Force Base, Florida.

The squadron was first activated as the 34th Reconnaissance Squadron in the spring of 1942, but was soon renamed the 423d Bombardment Squadron, one of the original four squadrons assigned to the 306th Bombardment Group. After training with Boeing B-17 Flying Fortresses, the squadron moved overseas and participated in the strategic bombing campaign against Germany, earning two Distinguished Unit Citations for its efforts. After the war the 423d remained in Europe with the occupation forces until inactivating in 1946.

The squadron was activated again at Langley Air Force Base, Virginia and served as a combat crew training squadron for aircrews flying the Douglas B-26 Invader. It was inactivated in 1954 when the 345th Bombardment Group became the tactical bomber unit at Langley.

The third active period for the unit began in 1959 when Strategic Air Command (SAC) expanded its Boeing B-47 Stratojet wings from three to four squadrons. It flew the Stratojet until 1962 when SAC alert commitments changed and Stratojet wings returned to a three squadron structure.

== History ==
=== World War II ===
==== Initial organization and training ====
The squadron was first established in March 1942 at Gowen Field, Idaho as the 34th Reconnaissance Squadron, one of the original four squadrons of the 306th Bombardment Group. In April, its personnel moved to Wendover Field, Utah, where it began training with Boeing B-17 Flying Fortress heavy bombers and was redesignated as the 423d Bombardment Squadron. On 1 August 1942, the squadron's ground echelon began its deployment, spending a week at Richmond Army Air Base, Virginia before moving to Fort Dix, New Jersey at the Port of Embarkation. It sailed on the RMS Queen Elizabeth on 30 August, arriving in Scotland on 5 September 1942. The air echelon departed for Westover Field, Massachusetts, and began ferrying their B-17s to England via the North Atlantic ferrying route.

==== Combat in Europe ====
The squadron settled into its combat station, RAF Thurleigh, England, in early September. Although several bomber units arrived in England before the 423d, when these units left England to participate in Operation Torch it became, along with its companion squadrons of the 306th Group, the oldest bombardment squadrons of VIII Bomber Command. It flew its first combat mission on 9 October 1942 against a steel factory near Lille, France, but with poor results. This was the first mission on which VIII Bomber Command assembled a strike force of over 100 bombers. (Note: With the departure of units to North Africa in Operation Torch, it would be six months before VIII Bomber Command could duplicate this feat. Freeman, p. 18.) The squadron operated primarily against strategic targets, including the locomotive factory at Lille, marshalling yards at Rouen, France, and Stuttgart, Germany. The squadron took part in the first strike into Germany by bombers of Eighth Air Force on 27 January 1943 when it struck U-boat yards at Wilhelmshaven. It struck shipbuilding yards at Vegesack, ball bearing plants at Schweinfurt, the aircraft factory at Leipzig, Germany, and similar facilities.

On 1 May 1943 the aircraft in which Staff Sergeant Maynard Smith was a gunner was struck by enemy fire, igniting fires in the plane's radio compartment and waist. Sgt Smith threw exploding ammunition overboard, extinguished the fire, administered first aid to the wounded tail gunner and manned his gun until enemy fighter aircraft were driven off. Sgt Smith was awarded the Medal of Honor for his actions on this mission.

On 11 January 1944, the squadron participated in an attack on an aircraft plant in central Germany, near Brunswick. Extensive cloud cover had resulted in the recall of two of the three bombardment divisions involved in the mission and made the rendezvous of the fighter groups scheduled to provide cover in the target area difficult. In contrast, clear weather to the east of the target permitted the Germans to assemble one of the largest fighter formations since October 1943, with 207 enemy fighters making contact with the strike force. For this mission, the squadron was awarded the Distinguished Unit Citation (DUC). The following month the squadron earned a second DUC for its performance during Big Week, an intensive bombing campaign against the German aircraft industry. Despite adverse weather on 22 February that led supporting elements to abandon the mission the squadron and group effectively bombed the aircraft assembly plant at Bernburg, Germany.

The squadron also performed in a tactical role, assisting ground forces Operation Cobra, the St Lo breakthrough, Operation Market Garden, the attempt to establish a bridgehead across the Rhine near Arnhem in the Netherlands, stopping German attacking forces in the Battle of the Bulge, and bombing enemy positions during Operation Varsity, the airborne assault across the Rhine in the spring of 1945.

After V-E Day, the squadron became part of the occupation forces and participated in Project Casey Jones, the photographic mapping of portions of Europe and North Africa. When the 306th Group began to phase out of the project in July the squadron was attached to the 305th Bombardment Group. Toward the end of 1946 responsibility for the unfinished portion of the project was transferred to XII Tactical Air Command. In February 1946, the squadron moved to Istres-Le Tubé Air Base, France, where it absorbed elements of the inactivating 92d and 384th Bombardment Groups, returning to Germany in July. The squadron was inactivated in December 1946.

=== Cold War ===
==== Light bomber training ====
During and immediately after the Korean War, Tactical Air Command (TAC) trained aircrews for the Douglas B-26 Invader at Langley Air Force Base, Virginia. The three squadrons of the 4400th Combat Crew Training Group performing this mission were Air National Guard units that had been mobilized for the war. At the start of 1953, these squadrons were returned to state control and the 423d was activated and took over the mission, personnel, and equipment of the 117th Bombardment Squadron, which returned to the Pennsylvania Air National Guard. In January 1954, the group mission shifted to tactical bombardment and it was redesignated the 4400th Bombardment Group. As the group began to anticipate the transition to Martin B-57 Canberra aircraft, TAC decided to replace the Table of Distribution 4400th Group and its squadrons with the regular 345th Bombardment Group, which took over their mission in July 1954 and the 423d was inactivated.

==== Strategic Air Command ====
The squadron was activated for a third time in 1959 as Strategic Air Command (SAC)'s Boeing B-47 Stratojet fleet reached a peak of twenty-seven wings From 1958, the Boeing B-47 Stratojet wings of SAC had assumed an alert posture at their home bases, reducing the amount of time spent on alert at overseas bases. The SAC alert cycle divided itself into four parts: planning, flying, alert and rest to meet General Thomas S. Power's initial goal of maintaining one third of SAC's planes on fifteen minute ground alert, fully fueled and ready for combat to reduce vulnerability to a Soviet missile strike. To implement this new system B-47 wings reorganized from three to four squadrons. The 423d was activated at MacDill Air Force Base, Florida as the fourth squadron of the 306th Bombardment Wing. The alert commitment was increased to half the squadron's aircraft in 1962 and the four squadron pattern no longer met the alert cycle commitment, so the squadron was inactivated on 1 January 1962.

== Lineage ==
- Constituted as the 34th Reconnaissance Squadron (Heavy) on 28 January 1942 (Note: This unit is not related to the 34th Reconnaissance Squadron (Fighter) activated 2 April 1943 as the 34th Observation Squadron and disbanded on 1 September 1943 without being fully manned or becoming operational. Maurer, Combat Squadrons, p. 166.)

Activated on 1 March 1942
Redesignated 423d Bombardment Squadron (Heavy) on 22 April 1942
Redesignated 423d Bombardment Squadron, Heavy on 20 August 1943
Inactivated on 25 December 1946
Redesignated 423d Bombardment Squadron, Light on 15 November 1952
Activated on 1 January 1953
Inactivated on 19 July 1954
Redesignated 423d Bombardment Squadron, Medium on 6 October 1958
Activated on 1 January 1959
Discontinued and inactivated on 1 January 1962

=== Assignments ===
- 306th Bombardment Group: 1 March 1942 – 25 December 1946 (attached to 305th Bombardment Group after 16 July 1946)
- 4430th Air Base Wing: 1 January 1953 (attached to 4400th Combat Crew Training Group)
- 4400th Combat Crew Training Group (later 4400th Bombardment Group, Tactical (Training)): 1 May 1953 – 19 July 1954
- 306th Bombardment Wing: 1 January 1959 – 1 January 1962

=== Stations ===
- Gowen Field, Idaho, 1 March 1942
- Wendover Field, Utah, c. 6 April – 1 August 1942
- RAF Thurleigh (Station 111), England, c. 9 September 1942

Detachment operated from Istres-Le Tubé Air Base (Y-17), France, 31 August – December 1945

- AAF Station Giebelstadt (Y-90), Germany, 17 December 1945
- Istres-Le Tubé Air Base (Y-17), France, 26 February 1946 (detachments operated from Mallard Field, French West Africa, March – May 1946 and from Gibraltar, June – 26 September 1946)
- AAF Station Lechfeld (R-71), Germany, 16 July – 25 December 1946 (detachment operated from Port Lyautey Airfield, French Morocco, 16 July – 26 September 1946)
- Langley Air Force Base, Virginia, 1 January 1953 – 19 July 1954
- MacDill Air Force Base, Florida, 1 January 1959 – 1 January 1962

=== Aircraft ===
- Boeing B-17 Flying Fortress, 1942–1946
- Douglas B-26 Invader, 1953–1954
- Boeing B-47 Stratojet, 1959–1961

=== Awards and campaigns ===
Award streamer	Award	Dates	Notes
	Distinguished Unit Citation	11 January 1944	Germany
	Distinguished Unit Citation	22 February 1944	Germany

Campaign Streamer	Campaign	Dates	Notes
	Air Offensive, Europe		
	Normandy		
	Northern France		
	Rhineland		
	Ardennes-Alsace		
	Central Europe		
	Air Combat, EAME Theater		

== See also ==
- List of B-47 units of the United States Air Force
- List of A-26 Invader operators
- B-17 Flying Fortress units of the United States Army Air Forces
