= Australian Aboriginal Progressive Association =

Aboriginal rights organisation in New South Wales, 1924–1927

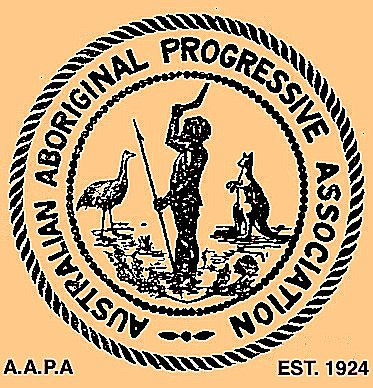
- This image was used to identify the AAPA and act as a symbol of Aboriginal activism.
- Founded: 1924
- Founder: Fred Maynard
- Defunct: 1927
- Area served: NSW Australia
- Key people: Fred Maynard, Tom Lacey, J. Johnstone, James Linwood, Joe Anderson, Elizabeth McKenzie-Hatton

The Australian Aboriginal Progressive Association (AAPA) was an early Indigenous Australian organisation focused on Aboriginal rights, founded in 1924 by Fred Maynard and based in Sydney, New South Wales (NSW). It ceased operations in 1927. The AAPA is known as the first Aboriginal activist group in Australia, with its membership roster peaking at over 600 members, with 13 branches and 4 sub-branches in NSW.

The aims of the AAPA were to stop the removal of Aboriginal children from their homes, to gain equality between Aboriginal and non-Aboriginal society, to preserve Indigenous cultural identity and citizenship, and to ensure Indigenous Australians were equipped to reach economic independence through reattaining land ownership. It also called for the eradication of the NSW Aborigines Protection Board (APB), and held that Indigenous people should be in charge of Indigenous matters.

== History and description ==
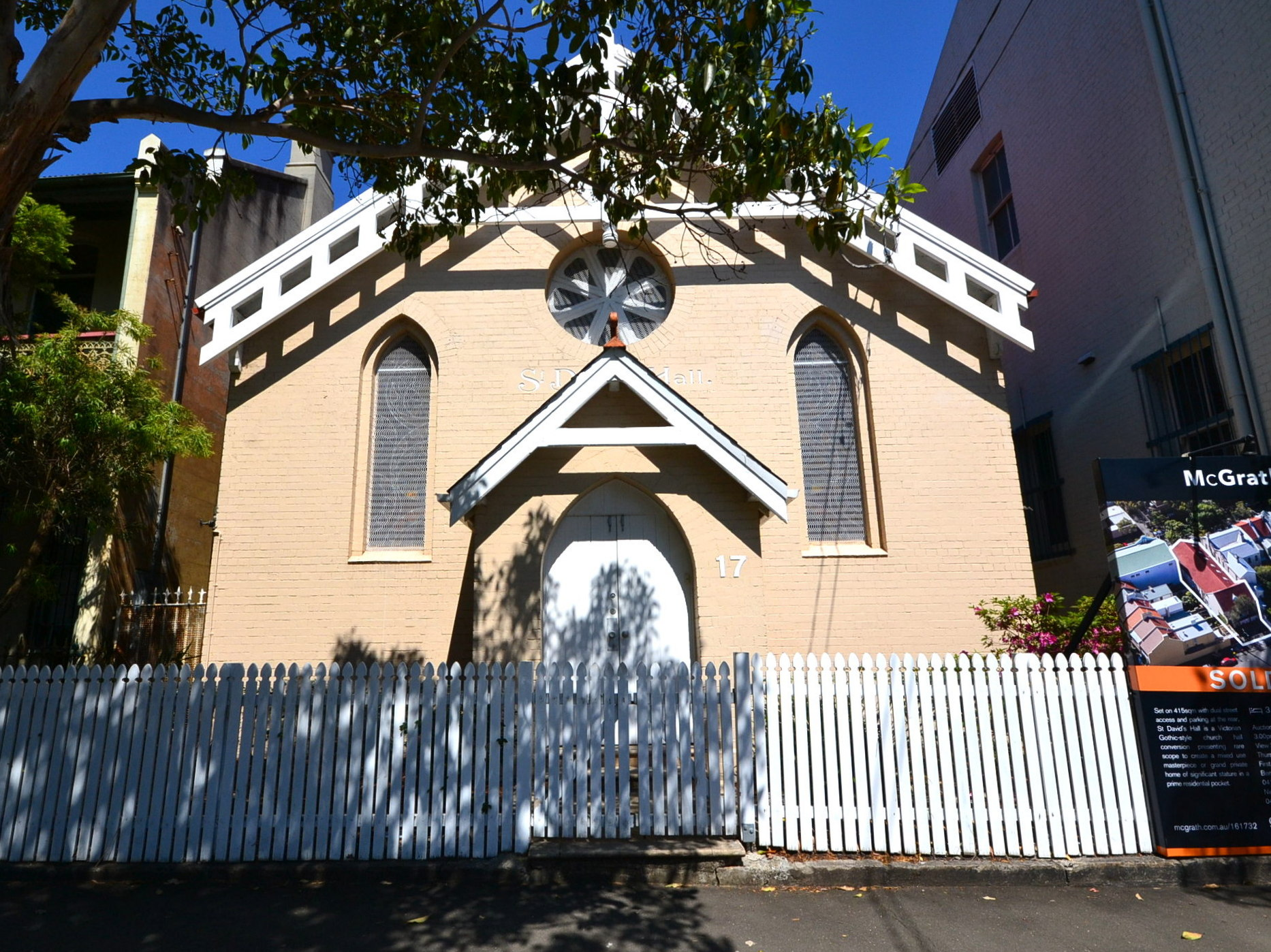
St David's Church Hall in Surry Hills

Founded in 1924 by Fred Maynard and publicly announced the following year, the aim of the association was to defend the rights of Aboriginal people. This included stopping the removal of Aboriginal children from their homes, gaining equality with non-Aboriginal society, preserving Indigenous cultural identity, gaining Australian citizenship, and ensuring that Indigenous Australians were equipped to reach economic independence through reattaining land ownership. The AAPA called for the eradication of the NSW Aborigines Protection board, and that Indigenous people be in charge of Indigenous matters. Approximately 500 members joined the association within the first six months of its commencement.

Maynard had been involved in another organisation, the Coloured Progressive Association, a decade earlier, and he and co-leader Tom Lacey were inspired by the ideas of Jamaican activist Marcus Garvey.

The organisation was based in Surry Hills, Sydney, but eventually expanded to 11 branches across New South Wales, and over 500 active members. It campaigned against the NSW Aborigines Protection Board (APB) to gain Indigenous rights to land, identity and citizenship, alongside the fight to end the removal of Aboriginal children from their homes (now known as the Stolen Generations).

The AAPA was motivated by the mistreatment of Aboriginal people throughout Australia's past. The year 1788 marked the first year Europeans placed Indigenous Australians amongst new diseases, violence, dispossession and displacement. Leading to a significant decrease in the Indigenous population and the slow removal of their culture throughout the nation. The Aborigines Protection Act 1909 was introduced in the 20th century, which aimed to protect Indigenous Australians through methods such as assimilation. The introduction of this law gave power to organisations such as the NSW APB. In 1915, the act introduced an amendment which allowed for the removal of Indigenous Australians under 21.

The practice of removing Indigenous children from their homes was an attempt by the Australian government to improve their welfare and protect the children from neglect through assimilation. This policy lasted from the 1910s to the 1970s. Around one in three Indigenous children were removed from their homes and families under this policy. Once the children were removed they would be forced into Caucasian society which banned them from speaking their Indigenous language or partake in any practices from their traditional culture. This included changing their names and overall identities. The children were abused and mistreated. This example of Aboriginal mistreatment and corrupt government policy is one of the reasons the association was created to speak against the government. Alongside this, land allocated to Indigenous Australians was reduced from 26,000 acres to 13,000 acres between the years 1913 and 1927, forcing families to relocate from their homelands.

The first conference was held in April 1925 in St David's church hall, Riley Street, Surry Hills, with over 200 Aboriginal people in attendance. It caught the attention of the public, the media, and authorities. News of the conference made the front page of The Daily Guardian, a Sydney newspaper, on 24 April 1925. In October 1925, a second conference was held, this time in Kempsey, New South Wales. More than 700 Aboriginal people attended the three-day event, where various individuals as well as other Aboriginal associations' members spoke.

At the Kempsey gathering, representatives from across the Northern Rivers region were in attendance. This purpose of this conference was to discuss the best approaches to furthering the AAPA. Eugene Miranda, President of Kempsey branch of the AAPA, introduced the conference, expressing his passion towards the association and political, spiritual and social connections he had to the group. John Donovan represented Nambucca Heads. On his return from the previous conference in Sydney, he congregated people together to form a new branch to expand the AAPA. Flanders was representing Bowraville. This branch recognised its economic stability and decided it would help fund the AAPA through holding cricket matches for young men. Representative for Maclean, Mr Shannan, pushed for the values of the AAPA in his respective branch similar to other representatives and delegates.

As it is the proud boast of Australia that every person born beneath the Southern Cross is born free, irrespective of origin, race, colour, creed, religion or any other impediment. We the representatives of the original people, in conference assembled, demand that we shall be accorded the same full right and privileges of citizenship as are enjoyed by all other sections of the community. - Fred Maynard

The organisation was inspired by the Universal Negro Improvement Association (UNIA) and their leader, Marcus Garvey, in how they approached gaining government attention. The AAPA held street marches and conventions similar to the UNIA as well as publishing articles in local newspapers. Maynard's presence in newspapers is what led to the APB's decision to remove his rights to visit and speak on Aboriginal reserves.

The organisation led protests and street rallies in an attempt to change Australia's political system to achieve the rights of Indigenous Australians. They held conferences, wrote to newspapers and petitioned political leaders.

The AAPA held three more conferences each year before their operations ceased. Several of these were held at St David's hall, including the half-yearly conference held to outline the progress of the AAPA.

The editor of Newcastle paper The Voice of North, J. J. Maloney, was an ally of Maynard. Maloney published Maynard's various pieces in his newspaper about Aboriginal rights and striving for self-sufficiency and Indigenous governance, raising concerns about the oppression towards Aboriginal Australians and the ineffectiveness of the NSW APB.

In 1927, AAPA published a manifesto, which it delivered to all both state and federal governments, and also published it widely across NSW, South Australia, Victoria, and Queensland. It requested for an Aboriginal board to be established under the Commonwealth Government, and for control by state governments over Aboriginal lives to end. It proposed a board comprising Aboriginal elected officers.

== The end of the AAPA ==
The association was dissolved by the end of 1927.

Aboriginal studies scholar John Maynard, Fred Maynard's grandson, believes that the main reason for the breakup of AAPA was harassment by police acting on behalf of the APB. The Inspector General of New South Wales Police was also APB chairman. AAPA members were threatened by police with jail or removal of their children, and the APB ran smear campaigns in newspapers about AAPA members, especially Fred Maynard, and gave biased information about them to men in power, just as NSW Premier Jack Lang.

The end of the AAPA is still debated as there is no solid reason for its disintegration. Some believe the cause to be the rise of the Great Depression in Australia, while Maynard's children attribute it to the scarcity of their father's work. Uralla elder Reuben Kelly believed it to be because of Maynard's lack of persuasiveness.

== Significance and legacy ==
The association is not heard about much today; however, Australia's later Aboriginal political movements have been greatly influenced by the foundation built by Maynard and the AAPA. The organisation gave a voice to Aboriginal people across Australia to fight against the oppression faced by Aboriginal people under Australia's colonial regime. This was the first time Australia had witnessed Aboriginal political protest, so it had significant impact.

The organisation left public memory shortly after their discontinuation due to continuous police scrutiny and government pressure, but has re-entered public discussion in recent times due to research by John Maynard into his grandfather, as well the workings of the AAPA. He has likened the demands of the AAPA to the 2023 proposal for an Indigenous Voice to Parliament, which grew out of the 2017 Uluru Statement from the Heart.

== People ==
=== Fred Maynard ===
Fred Maynard was born in 1879, and was the founder and leader of the AAPA. Maynard was a Worimi man who aimed to voice his disapproval of Aboriginal mistreatment. Maynard's uncle Tom Phillips was an Aboriginal farmer whose reserve was taken by the NSW APB in 1916, and access to the reserve by Indigenous people was removed entirely. Maynard rose to leadership through use of his skills in public speaking to voice the concerns of Indigenous Australians. Due to his pervasive and passionate stance against the NSW APB, his rights to speak on Aboriginal reserves were revoked.

Maynard had connections with members of the Coloured Progressive Association (CPA), that operated in Sydney from 1903 to 1919, and Marcus Garvey's Universal Negro Improvement Association. Maynard and Tom Lacey took inspiration from Garvey's leadership role and his message preaching cultural pride.

We want to work out our own destiny. Our people have not had the courage to stand together in the past, but now we are united, and are determined to work for the preservation for all of those interests, which are near and dear to us. - Fred Maynard

=== J. Johnstone ===
J. Johnstone was the vice-president of the AAPA. Johnstone came from a family who, in 1882, settled the Wingham reserve and had it removed from them in 1921. Johnstone was similarly in the Aborigines Progressive Association, under the leadership of William Ferguson.

=== James Linwood ===
James Linwood also lost his 20 acres (8.1 ha) of land in 1924 after the land revocation. Linwood, as a valued public speaker, was the first of many to address the members of the AAPA at their first conference in 1925.

=== Joe Anderson ===
Members Joe Anderson and his brothers lost their land in 1924 in the Burragorang valley, forcing the family to relocate to Sydney and leave their homeland. This was Anderson's motivation to become an activist for AAPA. Anderson wrote speeches and rallied with the AAPA to demand equality.

=== Elizabeth McKenzie-Hatton ===
Elizabeth McKenzie-Hatton was a non-Indigenous woman from Victoria (and therefore not eligible for membership of AAPA), who supported their causes and among other activities, was involved in lobbying politicians by a campaign of writing letters to them. She also travelled around NSW to spread the message of the AAPA. She supported the cause by funding a home for young Aboriginal girls who were escaping violence from their place of work, which were under the control of the AAPA. The homes were in direct opposition to government homes, which led to the APB ordering constant surveillance and harassment by police of the homes. The home began in 1924 and ceased operations in 1925.

Within six months of the beginning of the AAPA, McKenzie-Hatton had written more than 600 letters to the media and others of interest, and racked up travelling expenses exceeding 40 pounds, travelling over 5,000 mi (8,000 km). She also helped gain support for Aboriginal people globally.

== See also ==
- Aborigines Progressive Association (NSW)
- Aborigines Progress Association (SA)
- Australian Aborigines' League, founded by William Cooper in Melbourne in 1933
