= Robert C. Maynard =

American journalist

- Born: Robert Clyve Maynard; June 17, 1937; Brooklyn, New York, U.S.
- Died: August 17, 1993 (aged 56); Oakland, California, U.S.
- Education: Harvard University
- Known for: Editor of Oakland Tribune; Maynard Institute co-founder
- Notable credit: The Oakland Tribune
- Spouse: Nancy Hicks Maynard (1975–1993)
- Children: Dori J., David, and Alex

Robert Clyve Maynard (June 17, 1937 – August 17, 1993) was an American journalist, newspaper publisher and editor, former owner of The Oakland Tribune, and co-founder of the Robert C. Maynard Institute for Journalism Education in Oakland, California.

== Biography ==
=== Early years ===
Maynard was one of six children to Samuel C. Maynard and Robertine Isola Greaves, both immigrants from Barbados. At 16 years of age, he dropped out of Brooklyn High School to pursue his passion for writing. Maynard became friends with influential New York writers James Baldwin and Langston Hughes and later acknowledged Martin Luther King Jr. as a hero.

=== Career ===
Maynard's career in journalism began in 1961 at the York Gazette & Daily in York, Pennsylvania. In 1965, he received a Nieman Fellowship to Harvard University and joined the editorial staff of the Washington Post the following year.

In 1979, Maynard took over as editor of The Oakland Tribune and became the first African American to own a major metropolitan newspaper after purchasing the paper four years later. He is widely recognized for turning around the then struggling newspaper and transforming it into a 1990 Pulitzer Prize-winning journal.

Maynard greatly valued community involvement. He taught at local high schools and frequently attended community forums. His positive, proactive outlook helped many in need, including children of cocaine-addicted mothers and earthquake and firestorm victims. Maynard used the outreach of his newspaper to better the community by pushing for improved schools, trauma care centers, and economic development.

In 1997, Maynard was posthumously inducted into the California Newspaper Hall of Fame.

The Robert C. Maynard Institute for Journalism Education

In 1977, Maynard co-founded the Institute for Journalism Education, a nonprofit organization dedicated to training journalists of color and providing accurate representation of minorities in the news media. For more than thirty years, the Institute has trained over 1,000 journalists and editors from multicultural backgrounds across the United States.

=== Personal life ===
The Institute he co-founded with his second wife Nancy Hicks Maynard (1947–2008) was renamed in his honor after his death from prostate cancer in 1993. His daughter, Dori J. Maynard, later become president and CEO of the Robert C. Maynard Institute for Journalism Education.

== Bibliography ==
- Nationalism and Community Schools. Washington: The Brookings Institution. 1968. OCLC 80975022.
- Ralph McGill's America and Mine. Athens: The University of Georgia. 1982. p. 15. ASIN B0006YOWZY. OCLC 11822319.
- Earthquakes, Freedom and the Future. Tucson: The University of Arizona. 1989. OCLC 22919891.
- Communication in the (Shrinking) Global Village. Bridgetown: Central Bank of Barbados. 1989. ISBN 976-602-035-3.
- Reflections on the Post-Cold War Era. Honolulu: East-West Center. 1992. OCLC 34489231.
- With Maynard, Dori J. Letters to My Children. Kansas City, MO: Andrews and McMeel. 1995. ISBN 0-8362-7027-4.
