= Charles Frederick Maynard =

Australian civil rights defender

Fred Maynard
- Born: Charles Frederick Maynard; 4 July 1879; Hinton, New South Wales, Australia
- Died: 9 September 1946 (aged 67); Rydalmere, Sydney, New South Wales
- Burial place: Rookwood Cemetery
- Occupations: Indigenous activist; unionist
- Known for: Founder of the Australian Aboriginal Progressive Association

Charles Frederick Maynard (4 July 1879 – 9 September 1946) was an Aboriginal Australian activist who advocated for land rights, citizenship and equal rights for Aboriginal Australian people. He is known for being the founder of the Australian Aboriginal Progressive Association (AAPA) in Sydney, New South Wales.

== Early life ==
Fred Maynard was born on 4 July 1879, the third child of William Maynard, an English labourer, and Mary Maynard (née Phillips), an Aboriginal woman of Worimi and French-Mauritian descent. Mary Maynard died during childbirth in 1884, after which Fred and his brother Arthur were taken by a Protestant minister, who forced them to work long days, beat them, and housed them in a stable. However, during this time Maynard learned to read and the minister gave them access to his library.

In his early teens, Maynard and his brother escaped the minister and moved to their sister's home in Sydney. From this point, Maynard travelled extensively, working a number of different jobs: photographer, gardener, drover and bullock driver.

== Political activism and the AAPA ==
In 1907, Maynard returned to Sydney, working as a wharf labourer in Woolloomooloo. Here, Maynard was exposed to unionist ideas, joining the Waterside Workers' Federation of Australia, and came into contact with African American and Afro-Caribbeans who brought with them exciting new political ideas, in particular, those of Marcus Garvey, the leader of the Universal Negro Improvement Association. He advocated for land rights, citizenship and equal rights for Aboriginal people.

In February 1925, Maynard and Tom Lacey founded the Australian Aboriginal Progressive Association, which advocated for the right of Aboriginal people to determine their own lives. The decision to create this organisation was heavily influenced by Maynard's own experience of being torn from his land and family in his youth. The Association wrote letters to newspapers and the Aboriginal Protection Board, and in 1927 petitioned the NSW Premier, Jack Lang, for the return of Aboriginal land. During this period, Maynard travelled extensively around the NSW North Coast protesting the theft of Indigenous-held land.

The Association spread throughout New South Wales, with 13 active branches. Maynard participated in public debates with public figures in opposition to changes to the administration of Aboriginal reserves. Maynard's vocal and staunch opposition to the Aboriginal Protection Board led to a series of public statements by the Board in an attempt to discredit Maynard, which eventually led to the dissolution of the AAPA.

== Later life, death and legacy ==
On 14 June 1928 Maynard married Minnie Critchley, a 32-year-old Englishwoman, with whom he had four children. He then lived life more privately, working to provide for his family.

He was badly injured by an accident while working on the wharf, causing one of his legs to be broken in six places, and later amputated. On 9 September 1946 Maynard died of diabetes mellitus at the Mental Hospital in Rydalmere, leaving his wife, two sons, and two daughters. He was buried in Rookwood Cemetery.

One of Fred Maynard's two sons was renowned jockey Mervyn Maynard (c. 1932-2017). Merv's son is Professor John Maynard, an academic and historian specialising in Aboriginal history and the influence of early African-American politics on Aboriginal politics at the University of Newcastle, where he is head of the Purai Global Indigenous History Centre.

In addition to his contemporary impact on the efforts of the Aboriginal Protection Board to steal Aboriginal land, Maynard's vocal style of opposition has had a significant influence on successive generations of activists in NSW Indigenous communities.
