= Maynard Harrison Smith =

US Army Air Forces Medal of Honor recipient

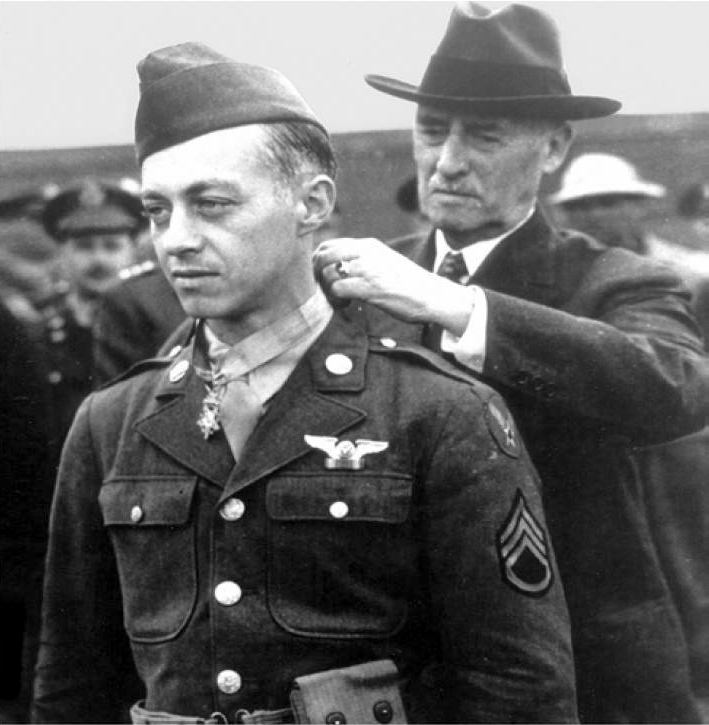
- Secretary of War Henry L. Stimson awarding the Medal of Honor to S/Sgt. Smith
- Born: May 19, 1911; Caro, Michigan
- Died: May 11, 1984 (aged 72); Saint Petersburg, Pinellas County, Florida, USA
- Burial place: Arlington National Cemetery, Arlington County, Virginia, USA
- Spouses: Arlene McCreedy (m. 1929–1932) Helen Gunsell (m. 1941–1942) Mary Rayner (m. 1944–1984)
- Children: 5
- Military career
- Allegiance: United States of America
- Branch: United States Army Air Forces
- Service years: 1942–1945
- Rank: Staff Sergeant
- Nickname: "Snuffy Smith"
- Service number: 36523097
- Unit: 423d Bombardment Squadron
- Conflicts: World War II
- Awards: Medal of Honor; Air Medal (2)

Maynard Harrison "Snuffy" Smith (May 19, 1911 – May 11, 1984) was a United States Army Air Forces staff sergeant and aerial gunner aboard a B-17 Flying Fortress bomber in World War II who received the Medal of Honor for his conduct during a bombing mission over France on 1 May 1943. Smith was the first enlisted member of the United States Army Air Forces to earn the Medal of Honor.

== Early life ==
Maynard Harrison Smith was born on May 19, 1911, in Caro, Michigan. His father was a successful attorney, and his mother was a school teacher. As a child, he had a reputation of being a spoiled troublemaker, so his father sent him to the Howe Military Academy in Howe, Indiana. After graduating, Smith worked for the U.S. Treasury Department, and the Michigan Banking Commission. In 1929, Smith married Arlene McCreedy (1911–1997), but they divorced in 1932. Smith's father died in 1934, and he quit his job, choosing to live off of his father's inheritance. He married his second wife, Helen Gunsell (1921–2005), in 1941 and had one son, William. This marriage also ended in divorce in September 1942. Smith enlisted in the Army on August 31, 1942. An apocryphal story states that after Smith failed to make child support payments to Gunsell, he appeared before a judge who gave him the choice of serving a jail term or enlisting in the military, and he later appeared for a photo in the local newspaper with fellow inductees leaving for service still in handcuffs and escorted by the sheriff.

== Military service ==
After completing basic training, he volunteered for aerial gunnery school. At the time, all aerial gunners were non-commissioned officers and the move to the school was a quick way for a private to gain rank and pay.

After completing aerial gunnery school, he was shipped overseas to Thurleigh, Bedfordshire, in south-central England, where he joined the 423rd Bombardment Squadron, 306th Bomb Group. Staff Sergeant Smith was short in stature, and quickly gained a reputation as a stubborn and obnoxious airman who did not get along well with the other airmen stationed there. He soon earned the nickname "Snuffy Smith", possibly after the character from a popular comic strip of the era, Barney Google and Snuffy Smith. Consequently, it was six weeks before he was assigned his first combat mission.

=== Medal of Honor action ===
On his first mission, on 1 May 1943, Staff Sergeant Smith, who was assigned to the ball gun turret, helped save the lives of six of his wounded comrades and put out a blazing fire after his aircraft was hit, and drove off wave after wave of German fighters.

The target of the mission was the U-boat pens at Saint-Nazaire in Loire-Atlantique, France, on the Bay of Biscay. Saint Nazaire was heavily defended by antiaircraft guns and was nicknamed "flak city" by the airmen.

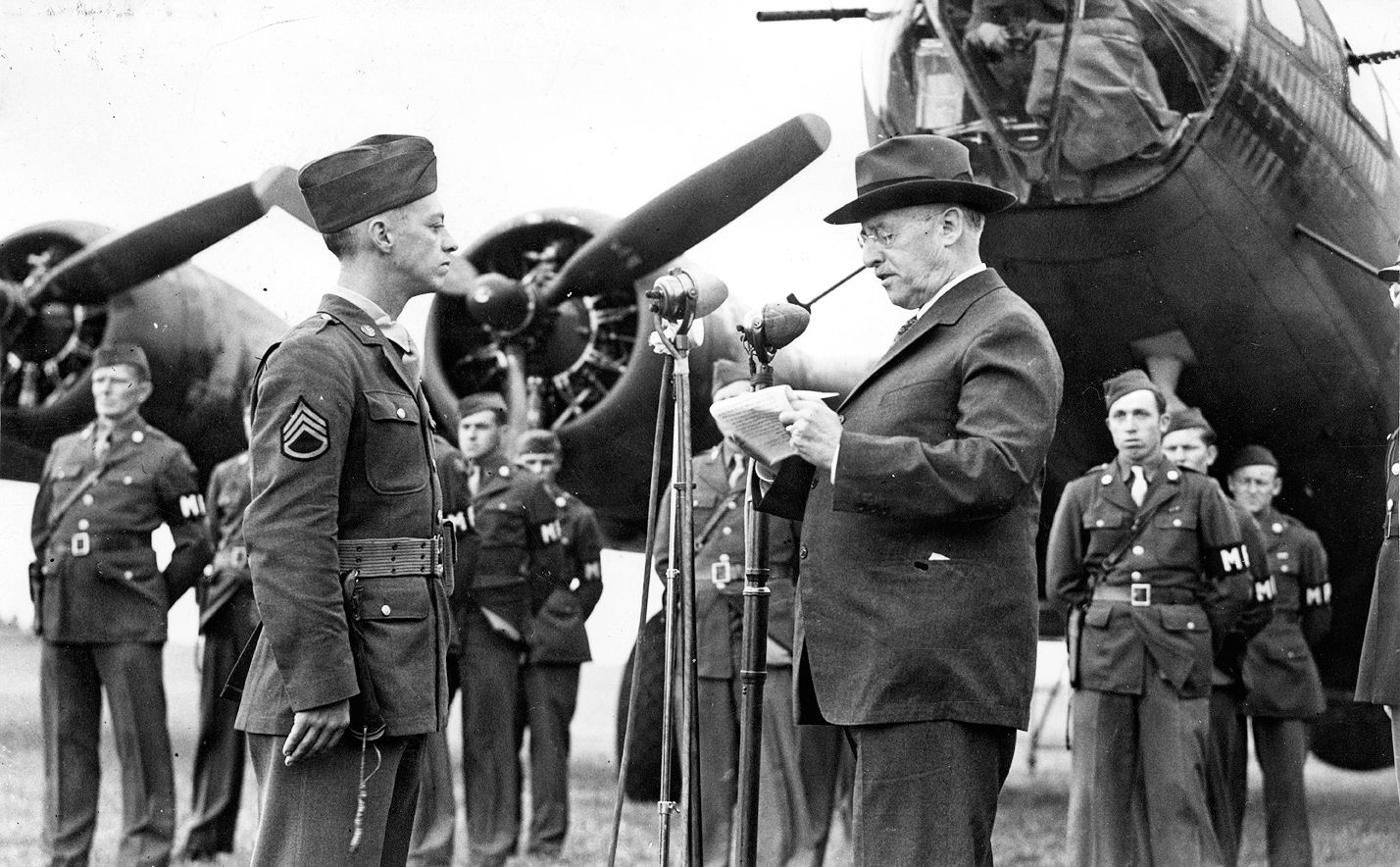
Staff Sergeant Maynard Smith of the 306th Bombardment Group, is presented with the Medal of Honor by Secretary of War Henry L Stimson in front of a B-17 Flying Fortress at Thurleigh Airfield, USAAF Station 111, England.

Several of the bombers failed to rendezvous as intended, and others had mechanical problems and had to turn back. The middle portion of the bombing mission went well, with no German fighters engaging the American aircraft until after they had released their bomb loads on target. As the fighters came up, the Americans managed to elude them by flying into a large cloud bank.

Due to a navigational error, after emerging from the clouds, the navigator in the lead plane believed he was approaching the southern coast of Britain. In fact, the aircraft were actually approaching the heavily fortified French city of Brest and the southern coast of the Breton Peninsula. The pilot began to descend to 2,000 feet (610 m) and was almost immediately set upon by several German fighters and intense anti-aircraft fire.

Staff Sergeant Smith's bomber was hit, rupturing a fuel tank and igniting a massive fire in the center of the fuselage. The damage was severe, knocking out communications and compromising the fuselage's integrity. Smith's ball turret lost power, and he scrambled out to assist the other crewmen. Three crewmen bailed out, while Smith tended to two others who were seriously wounded.

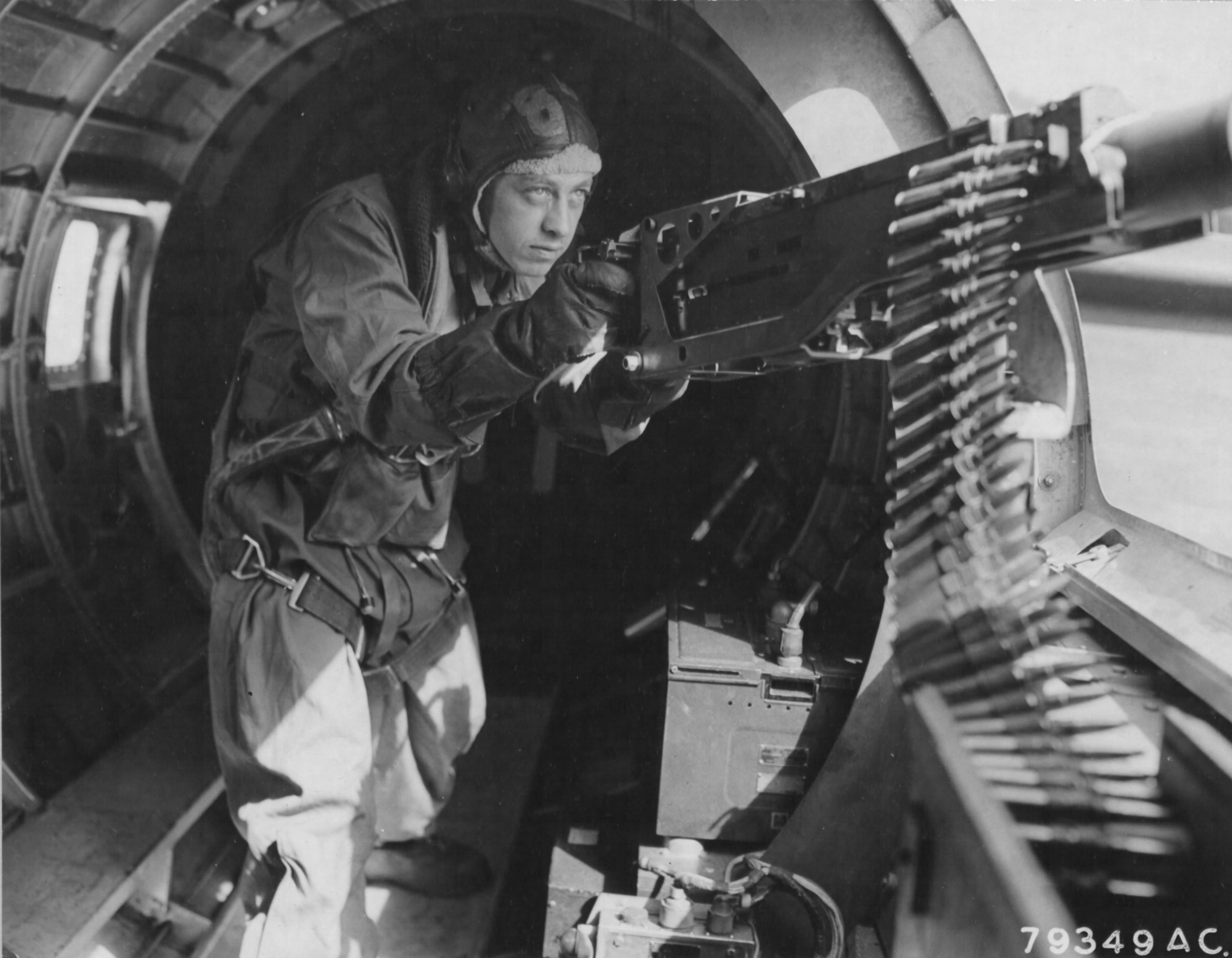
Smith manning a machine gun

In between helping his wounded comrades, Smith also manned the .50 caliber machine guns and fought the raging fire. The heat from the fire was so intense that it began to melt the metal in the fuselage, threatening to break the plane in half.

For nearly 90 minutes, Smith alternated between shooting at attacking fighters, tending to the wounded, and fighting the fire. To starve the fire of fuel, he threw burning debris and exploding ammunition through the large holes that the fire had melted in the fuselage. After the fire extinguishers were exhausted, Smith finally managed to put the fire out, in part by urinating on it.

Smith's bomber reached England and landed at the first available airfield, where it broke in half as it touched down. It had been hit with more than 3,500 bullets and pieces of shrapnel. The three crewmen who bailed out were never seen again and were presumed lost at sea, but Smith's efforts undoubtedly saved the lives of the six others aboard his aircraft.

Journalist Andy Rooney, at the time a reporter for Stars and Stripes, was at the base where Smith's plane landed and wrote a front-page story about it. While reflecting on Smith's award years later on 60 Minutes, Rooney said, "I was proud of my part in that."

Smith was assigned to KP duty the week that he was awarded the Medal of Honor as punishment for arriving late to a briefing. U.S. Secretary of War Henry L. Stimson placed the medal around Smith's neck during a formation.

== Later life and death ==
Smith flew four more combat missions after earning the Medal of Honor, but was then grounded as a result of combat stress reaction/Post-traumatic stress disorder and was reassigned to non-combat clerical work. On December 17, 1944, he was forced to accept a reduction in rank to private for poor job performance, and was shortly thereafter permanently grounded. Smith was sent home to the United States on February 2, 1945, and despite his transgressions, received a hero's welcome and a parade when he returned to his hometown. Smith was discharged from the U.S. Army on May 26, 1945. In his later years, he despised his time in the military and ran into legal troubles, but eventually retired quietly to Florida, dying of heart failure on May 11, 1984, in Saint Petersburg, at the age of 72. Maynard Harrison Smith is buried in Arlington National Cemetery, in Arlington, Virginia.

== Personal life ==
Smith met his third wife, Mary Rayner (1924–2015), in Bedford, England, while attending a dance put on for servicemen by the USO. They married in 1944, and eventually had four children (three sons, Lawrence, Ronald, and Maynard Jr., and a daughter, Christine). Their daughter Christine was born in England prior to the couple's return to the United States. After Smith's death, his wife remarried Robert J. O'Brien.

== Medal of Honor citation ==
Citation text:

For conspicuous gallantry and intrepidity in action above and beyond the call of duty. The aircraft of which Sgt. Smith was a gunner was subjected to intense enemy antiaircraft fire and determined fighter aircraft attacks while returning from a mission over enemy-occupied continental Europe on 1 May 1943. The aircraft was hit several times by antiaircraft fire and cannon shells of the fighter aircraft, 2 of the crewmen were seriously wounded, the aircraft's oxygen system shot out, and several vital control cables severed when intense fires were ignited simultaneously in the radio compartment and waist sections. The situation became so acute that 3 of the crewmen bailed out into the comparative safety of the sea. Sgt. Smith, then on his first combat mission, elected to fight the fire by himself, administered first aid to the wounded tail gunner, manned the waist guns, and fought the intense flames alternately. The escaping oxygen fanned the fire to such intense heat that the ammunition in the radio compartment began to explode, the radio, gun mount, and camera were melted, and the compartment completely gutted. Sgt. Smith threw the exploding ammunition overboard, fought the fire until all the firefighting aids were exhausted, manned the workable guns until the enemy fighters were driven away, further administered first aid to his wounded comrade, and then by wrapping himself in protecting cloth, completely extinguished the fire by hand. This soldier's gallantry in action, undaunted bravery, and loyalty to his aircraft and fellow crewmen, without regard for his own personal safety, is an inspiration to the U.S. Armed Forces.

== Awards and Decorations ==
SSG Smith was awarded the following for his service

Badge	USAAF Enlisted Aircrew badge		
1st row	Medal of Honor	Air Medal with 1 Oak leaf cluster	Army Good Conduct Medal
2nd row	American Campaign Medal	European–African–Middle Eastern Campaign Medal with 1 Campaign star	World War II Victory Medal
Unit awards	Presidential Unit Citation with 1 Oak leaf cluster		

== See also ==
- List of Medal of Honor recipients
