= Ralph Maynard Smith =

British artist, writer, and architect

Ralph Maynard Smith (27 June 1904 – 25 December 1964) was a British artist, writer and architect.
