= Station House Opera =

British performance art and theatre company

Station House Opera is a British performance art and theatre company. It was founded in 1980 by Julian Maynard Smith, who is still artistic director.

== History ==
Julian Maynard Smith (son of the evolutionary geneticist John Maynard Smith) and Miranda Payne founded the company in 1980, and Maynard Smith remains its artistic director. Maynard studied fine and performing arts in the 1970s and works as an actor, writer, performer and director. The company has worked with artists and others from many different fields. The work varies enormously in scale, appearance and location and uses spectacle to explore the intimate relationship between people and the environment they inhabit. Described as "Brilliant...one of Britain's most inventive experimental theatre companies" and "unlike anything you've ever seen before", the company has created projects in a locations all over the world, from New York's Brooklyn Bridge Anchorage to Dresden's historic Frauenkirche and Salisbury Cathedral. More recently the work has been uniquely created for more intimate spaces in Europe, Asia and South America. Based in London, it is managed by Artsadmin. Station House Opera had a long working relationship with Stichting Mickery Workshop in Amsterdam, Netherlands.

== Work ==
The company has created over thirty productions. While some are stand-alone pieces, others form groups that explore general themes using a particular material or methodology. The first few plays, including Natural Disasters, were a part of Station House Opera's series of architectural performances which the company is still well known for. "Natural Disasters" was a show in which Station House Opera explored the medium of flying and spatial freedom. A lot of productions they have done involve the use of fly-ins and the 3-dimensional space. Many productions followed after that. Drunken Madness, Scenes From A New Jericho and Cuckoo destabilised the mundane physical world of the performers by taking the action precariously to the air.

These projects opened up the doors for the company to take more risks and in 1989 The Bastille Dances was commissioned to celebrate the bicentenary of the French Revolution. The piece started from the image of the revolution and continued to show the storming and demolition of Bastille and the scattering of its stones throughout Paris. The Bastille Dances was commissioned by Theatre de Cherboug and the London International Festival of theatre and funded by Arts Council of Great Britain. This opened up the company to begin touring during the 1990s. Other works similar to Bastille Dances, Dedesenn nn rrrrrr and The Salisbury Proverbs, used loose breeze blocks with which performers built, demolished and rebuilt structures of an architectural scale. Snakes and Ladders, Roadmetal Sweetbread and Mare's Nest used video projection to generate doubled versions of the action on stage that posed questions of perception and interpretation. Recent work such as Live from Paradise, Play on Earth, and The Other Is You has concentrated on video streaming over the internet to bring performances in different parts of the world together in the creation of a single event that is both physical and virtual. These works are meant to create an event that is physical and virtual.
