= Rohrerhaus =

Coordinates: 46.640032°N 11.354021°E

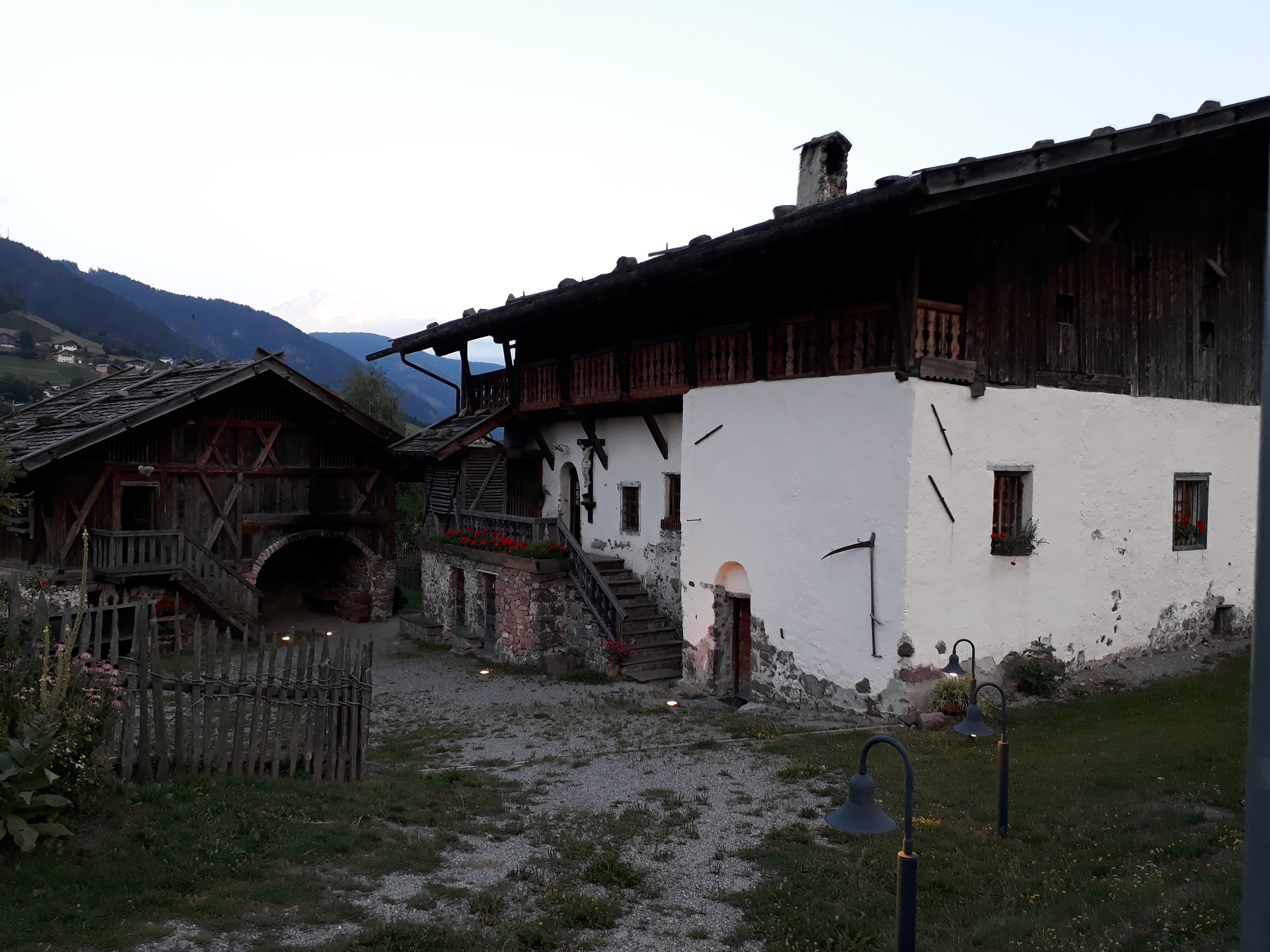
The Rohrerhaus

The Rohrerhaus (or Rohrerhof) is a farm in Sarnthein, Northern Italy. The earliest record of the Rohrerhof was in 1288. It is one of the oldest and largest farms in Sarntal. It is owned by the municipality of Sarntal and is now used as a museum and venue for meetings.

== History ==
The earliest mention of the Rohrerhaus was found in the Urbar, a tax register from the year 1288, at the time of the Tyrolean Count Meinhard II. Several documents prove the continued existence of the farm. Since the first mention, four families lived in the house. The first family, the Rohrer family, farmed at the site for 250 years, about six generations. Their successors, the von Gagers, stayed for 140 years, four generations long, in the Rohrerhaus. In the meantime, the house was expanded and got a larger room. The Gothic wall paneling probably dates from the 16th century. In 1703, the house was extended on the mountainside and got an upper floor and the roof, which still exist today. In 1775, the first count of the houses and farms in the Sarntal valley was carried out and entered in the cadastre. Of the over 200 farms in the Sarntal, the Rohrerhaus was the second most valuable. During this time the Oberauch family spent four generations in the Rohrerhaus. The last family was the Gruber family, who had lived since 1850 in the Rohrerhaus.

In 2002, the municipality of Sarntal bought the farm and used the house as a venue and a museum.

== Museum ==
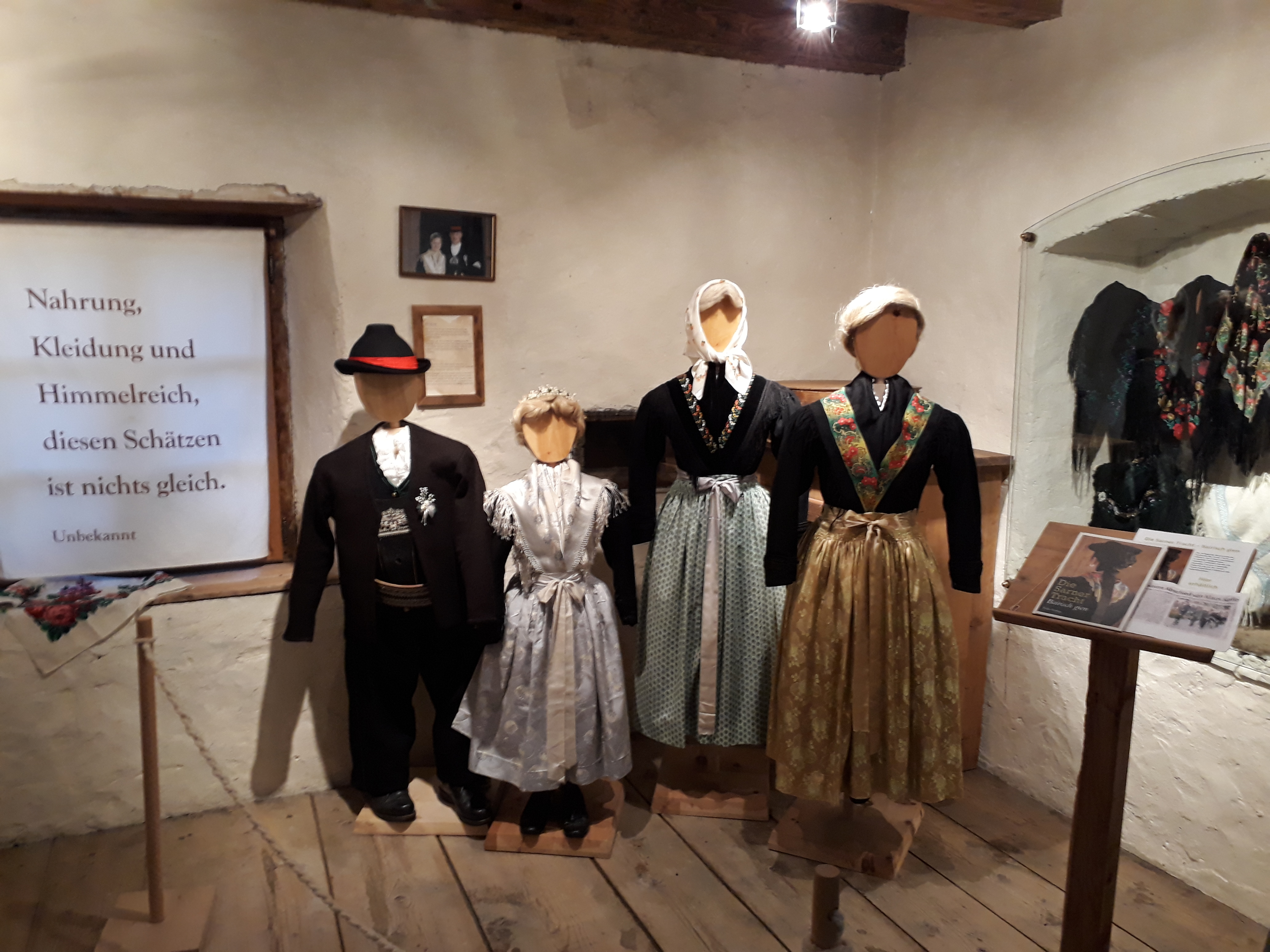
Traditional folk costumes from Sarntal

The Rohrerhaus is now used as a museum. The exhibition covers the 700-year history of the Rohrerhof and gives a brief history of Tyrolean farming customs. The museum opens in the summer, and guided tours are usually offered in the afternoon. In addition, the museum can also be rented for organizing events.

== Association ==
The Rohrerhaus association was founded on March 9, 2004. In 2009, the association was included in the state register of voluntary organizations. The aim is to preserve the cultural and historical value of the farm, to care for it and to pass it on to future generations. On March 10, 2005, the municipality of Sarntal handed the leadership of the Rohrerhaus to the association.
