= Otto of Carinthia =

Otto of Carinthia may refer to:

- Otto I, Duke of Carinthia
- Otto III, Duke of Carinthia
