= Reinbot von Dürne =

13th-century German poet

Reinbot von Dürne (fl. 1230s/1240s) was a German poet active at the court of Duke Otto II of Bavaria. He was probably a native of the region around Wörth an der Donau or possibly Walldürn.

Reinbot wrote Der heilige Georg, also called the Georgslegende, a Middle High German epic recounting the life and martyrdom of Saint George in 6,000 lines divided into rhyming couplets. It was written during the reign of Otto II from 1231 to 1253, but scholars disagree on a more precise dating. The Oxford Companion to German Literature dates it to the first years of Otto's rule (1231–1236). Internal evidence suggests that it was written after Otto established a marital alliance with the imperial Staufer family. This could be either the betrothal of his (unnamed) daughter to Conrad IV in 1235 or else Conrad's actual marriage to Otto's other daughter, Elizabeth, in 1246.

Der heilige Georg is centred on George's martyrdom and not his military career or his posthumous miracles. It is nonetheless shot through with crusading themes and anachronisms. It is set in the Roman Empire in the year 290. Reinbot is aware of the divided empire, distinguishing between Greece (Grêciâ or Kriechen) and the Latin lands (latînschiu lant). The empire is inhabited, however, by Saracens (Sarrazîn).

Georg is a courtly and chivalrous knight, the son of a margraf ('margrave') of Palestine. While his brothers, Theodôrus and Diomeder, go to Spain to fight Saracens, George goes to Cappadocia and Greece. During a battle with the pagan Tschofreit von Salnecke, an angel gives George a white banner with a red cross. After his exploits in Cappadocia, he gives up his retinue and, accompanied by a lone squire, Rîtschart, makes his way to the court of the pagan king Dâciân, who worships Apollo, Jupiter, Mahmet and Tervigant. There he is tortured on account of his faith. His torture is accompanied by miracles, leading to the conversion of many pagans, including the queen, Alexandrînâ. She is martyred as well. The episode of the dragon goes unmentioned.

In Der heilige Georg, Reinbot includes an apologetic passage in Georg's voice. He also includes an allegory of the "castle of virtue" (Wunderburg der Tugend). Reinbot praises the poets Wolfram von Eschenbach and Hartmann von Aue. He was especially influenced by Wolfram's Titurel. He describes Heinrich von Veldeke as the ideal courtly poet.

== Bibliography ==
- Chinca, Mark (2010). "Reinbot von Durne". In Bjork, Robert E. (ed.). The Oxford Dictionary of the Middle Ages. Oxford: Oxford University Press.
- Classen, Albrecht (2006). "Heinrich von Veldeke". In Will Hasty (ed.). German Literature of the High Middle Ages. Camden House. pp. 23–36.
- Garland, Henry; Garland, Mary, eds. (2005). "Reinbot von Dürne". The Oxford Companion to German Literature (3rd ed.). Oxford University Press.
- Murray, Alan V. (1986). "Reinbot von Durne's Der heilige Georg as Crusading Literature". Forum for Modern Language Studies. 22 (2): 172–183. doi:10.1093/fmls/XXII.2.172.
