= Henry of Bohemia =

King of Bohemia from 1307 to 1310

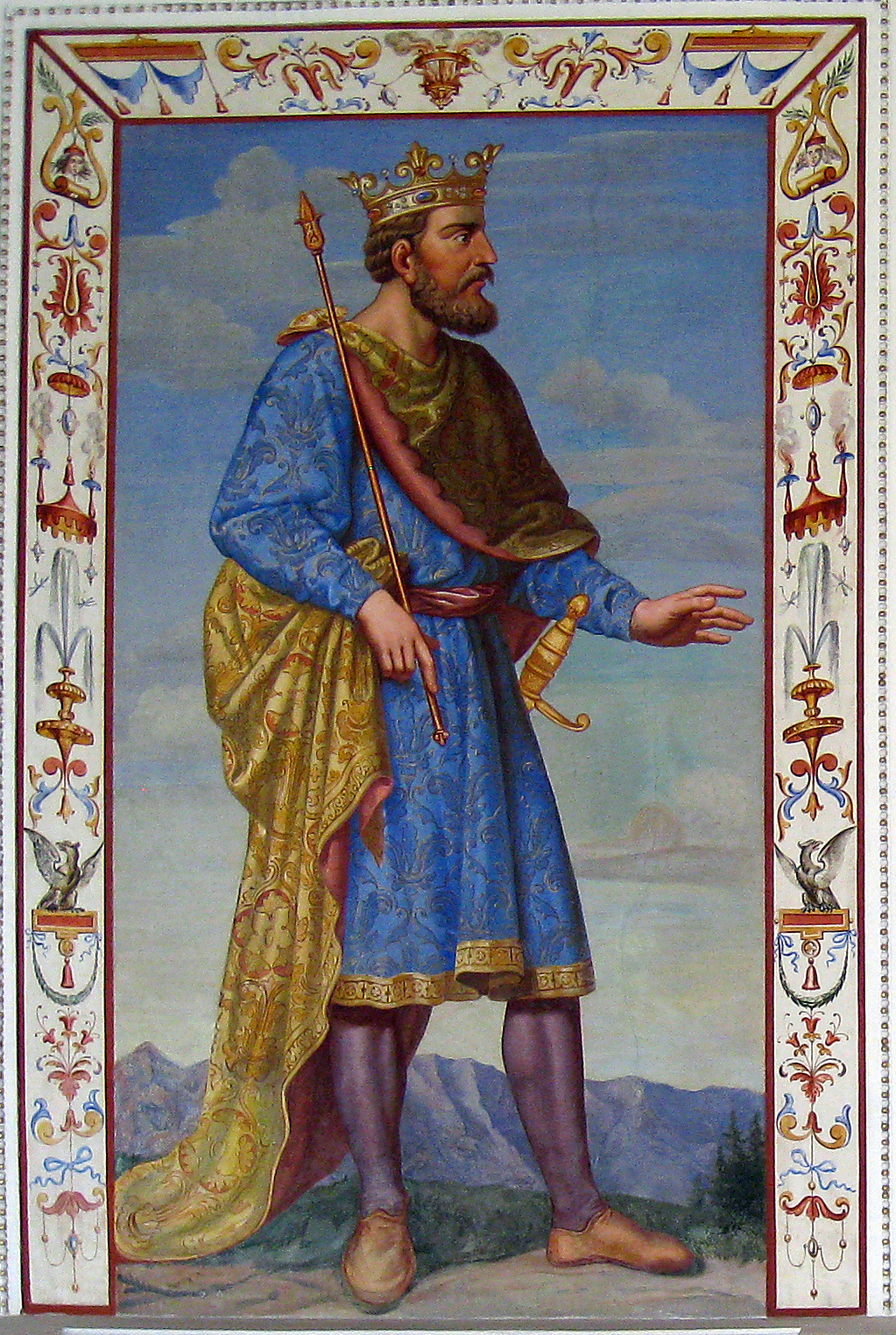
- 16th-century portrait of Henry of Bohemia in the Spanish Hall of Ambras Castle, near Innsbruck

King of Bohemia
- Reign: 3/4 July 1307 – 31 August 1310
- Predecessor: Rudolf I
- Successor: John the Blind

Duke of Carinthia and Landgrave of Carniola
- Reign: 1295 – 1335
- Predecessor: Meinhard
- Successor: Otto, Duke of Austria

Count of Tyrol
- Reign: 1295 – 1335
- Predecessor: Meinhard, Duke of Carinthia
- Successor: Margaret, Countess of Tyrol

Landgrave on the Savinja
- Reign: 1295 – 1308
- Predecessor: Meinhard, Duke of Carinthia
- Successor: Frederick the Fair
- Born: c. 1265
- Died: 2 April 1335 (aged 70); Tirol Castle, Tyrol
- Burial: Stams Abbey
- Spouse: Anne of Bohemia; Adelaide of Brunswick-Lüneburg; Beatrice of Savoy
- Issue: Margaret, Countess of Tyrol
- House: House of Gorizia
- Father: Meinhard, Duke of Carinthia
- Mother: Elisabeth of Wittelsbach

Henry of Bohemia (German: Heinrich, Czech: Jindřich Korutanský; c. 1265 – 2 April 1335), a member of the House of Gorizia, was Duke of Carinthia and Landgrave of Carniola (as Henry VI) and Count of Tyrol from 1295 until his death, as well as King of Bohemia, Margrave of Moravia and titular King of Poland in 1306 and again from 1307 until 1310. After his death, the Habsburgs took over Carinthia and Carniola and held them almost without interruption until 1918.

== Life ==
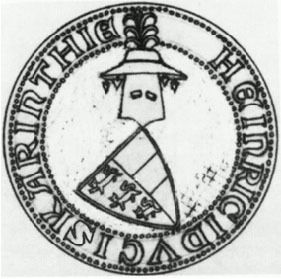
Seal of Duke Henry of Carinthia, 1303

Henry was a younger son of Count Meinhard II of Görz-Tyrol and Elizabeth of Bavaria, widow of King Conrad IV of Germany. Upon the partition of the Meinhardiner estates in 1271, his father maintained the Tyrolean lands, while Henry's uncle Albert received the County of Gorizia. In 1276 Count Meinhard married his eldest daughter, Henry's sister Elizabeth, to Albert, son of King Rudolph I of Germany, and in turn was enfeoffed with the Duchy of Carinthia in 1286.

After his father's death in late October 1295, Henry inherited the Tyrolean and Carinthian estates. At first, he ruled jointly with his brothers Otto (d. 1310) and Louis (d. 1305), until he outlived them. He secured his position by supporting his brother-in-law Albert I of Habsburg, who thereby was able to defeat rivalling Adolf of Nassau at the 1298 Battle of Göllheim and was elected King of the Romans in the same year. He also helped King Albert and his Wittelsbach ally Louis IV to lay siege against Louis' revolting brother Rudolf I of the Palatinate at his Heidelberg residence in 1301.

=== King of Bohemia ===
Tensions with the House of Habsburg arose when Henry married the Přemyslid princess Anne, the elder sister of King Wenceslaus III of Bohemia, in 1306. In the same year, the Bohemian ruler prepared for a military campaign against Poland and appointed his brother-in-law regent. Upon Wenceslaus' assassination on 4 August, the Přemyslids became extinct in the male line and Henry was elected his successor by the Bohemian nobility—against the will of his former ally King Albert I of Germany, who intended to install his eldest son Rudolf of Habsburg on the Bohemian throne.

King Albert's troops invaded Bohemia, besieged Prague Castle and deposed Henry, who had to yield to their superior forces. Nevertheless, Rudolf of Habsburg (mocked as král kaše, "King Porridge") was never accepted by the Bohemian nobles, and after his sudden death on 4 July 1307, Henry was re-elected King of Bohemia on 15 August. Another attack by King Albert was repelled, and the Habsburg threat was finally ended with Albert's assassination by his nephew John in 1308.

Although Henry was now one of the most powerful rulers in the Holy Roman Empire, his reign marked a period of instability in Bohemia. He was considered weak and wasteful by the Bohemian nobility, who began to look for a more capable successor. Meanwhile, the new German king Henry VII, a member of the House of Luxembourg, had also cast a covetous eye on the Bohemian kingdom. In 1310, Henry VII arranged the marriage of his eldest son John with Elizabeth, the younger sister of the late King Wenceslaus II.

Backed by local nobles and his father, John's troops invaded Bohemia in October of 1310. He captured Prague on 3 December and deposed Henry for the second time. The German king seized the Bohemian fief and ceded it to his son John, who was crowned king the next year. Henry was forced to retire to Carinthia, where his wife Anna died without children in 1313.

=== Retirement ===
Henry managed to retain Carinthia and Tyrol through reconciliation with the Habsburgs, ceding the March on the Sann (Savinja Valley in today Slovenia) to the Habsburg Duchy of Styria. He also kept de facto control over Carniola. He nevertheless was not able to acquire the Carinthian estates that were held by the prince-bishops of Bamberg with the consent of Emperor Henry VII. Centred in a compact territory between Villach and Tarvis, these possessions enjoyed the status of a virtually sovereign principality, and had a crucial geostrategic position on the only major route from Carinthia to Friuli and Italy. On the other hand, Henry could reinforce his overlordship in Tyrol against the resistance of the Trent and Brixen prince-bishops.

Despite his deposition, Henry continued to claim the title of king of Bohemia and the accompanying electoral dignity, voting for Habsburg candidate Frederick the Fair during the 1314 double election of the Holy Roman Emperor at Frankfurt. His contested right to vote was one of the reasons for the ambiguous result, as Henry's rival, the Luxembourg king John, gave his Bohemian vote to Louis IV of Bavaria. After Louis' victory in the 1322 Battle of Mühldorf, Henry helped to arrange a compromise between the competitors.

Henry also reconciled with the Luxembourgs and in 1330 married his daughter Margaret off to King John's son John Henry. Since he was the last male heir of the Tyrolean branch of the Meinhardiner dynasty, he attempted to maintain their possessions, but ultimately failed. Even though Emperor Louis IV, in return for Henry's mediation in the dispute with Frederick the Fair, had assured him in 1330 that his daughter could succeed him, Louis reneged on his promise in a secret treaty with the House of Habsburg in the same year.

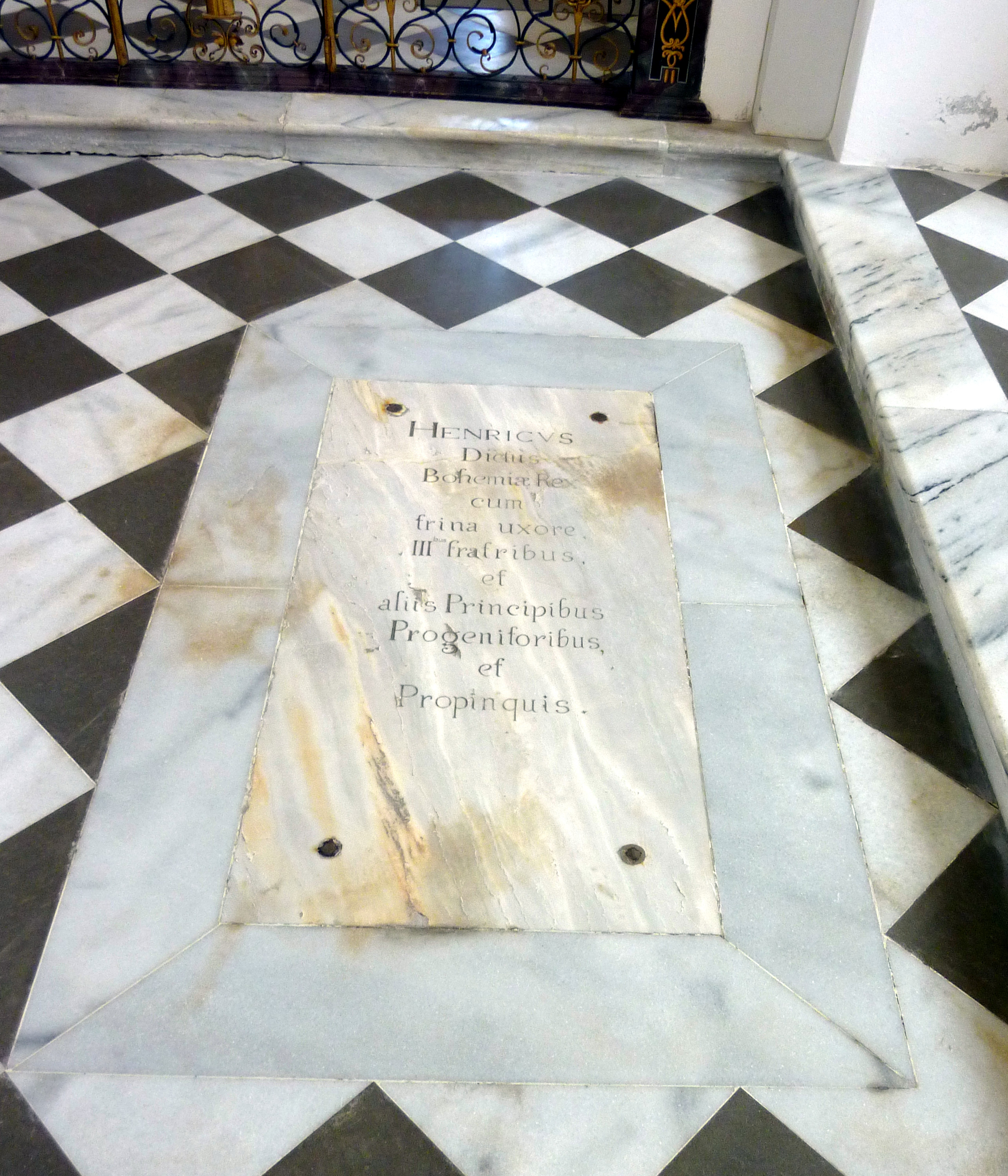
Tomb slab in Stams Abbey

After Henry's death in 1335, the Habsburg duke Albert II of Austria and his brother Otto took control of Carinthia and Carniola. Henry's daughter Margaret could only succeed him in Tyrol with the support of the local nobles; however, in 1363 she ultimately had to bequeath her lands to Albert's II son Duke Rudolf IV of Austria as well. The Gorizia branch of the Meinhardiner dynasty ruled their county until the extinction of the line in 1500, after which the estates likewise fell to the Habsburgs.

== Marriage and issue ==
Henry was married three times:

In 1306, he married Anna Přemyslovna (1290–1313). This marriage produced no children.

In 1313, he wed Adelaide of Brunswick (1285 – 16 August 1324), daughter of the Welf duke Henry I of Brunswick-Grubenhagen. This marriage produced two daughters:

1. Adelaide (1317–25 May 1325).
2. Margaret "Maultasch" (1318 – 3 October 1369, Vienna), Countess of Tyrol from 1335 to 1363.

In 1327, he married Beatrice (1310–1331), daughter of Count Amadeus V of Savoy. This marriage produced no children.

Henry of Bohemia Meinhardiner Born: c. 1265 Died: 2 April 1335
Preceded by Meinhard II	Duke of Carinthia; Margrave of Carniola; 1295–1335; With: Otto III and Louis	Succeeded by Albert II and Otto IV
Preceded by Meinhard II	Count of Tyrol; 1295–1335; With: Otto III and Louis	Succeeded by Margaret
Preceded by Wenceslaus III	King of Bohemia; 1306	Succeeded by Rudolf I
Preceded by Rudolf I	King of Bohemia; 1307–1310	Succeeded by John
