= Stams =

- Municipality
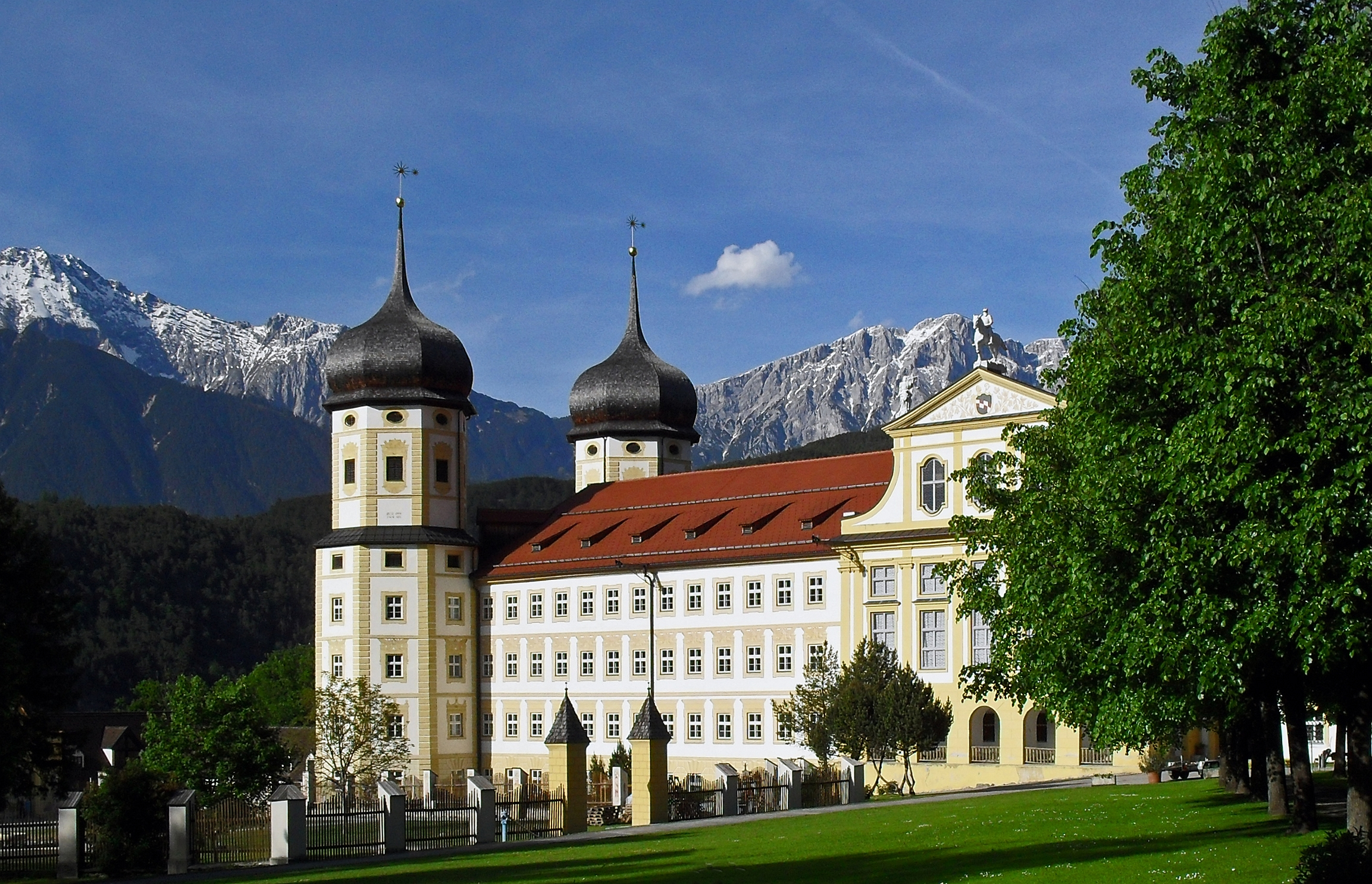
- Stams Abbey

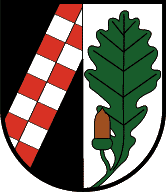
- Coat of arms

- Location within Austria
- Coordinates: 47°16′35″N 10°59′00″E
- Country: Austria
- State: Tyrol
- District: Imst

Government
  - Mayor: Franz Gallop

Area
  - Total: 33.56 km^{2} (12.96 sq mi)
- Elevation: 672 m (2,205 ft)

Population (2021)
  - Total: 1,556
  - Density: 46.36/km^{2} (120.1/sq mi)
- Time zone: UTC+1 (CET)
  - Summer (DST): UTC+2 (CEST)
- Postal code: 6422
- Area code: 05263
- Vehicle registration: IM
- Website: www.stams.co.at

Stams is a municipality in Imst District, in the Austrian state of Tyrol. It is chiefly known for Cistercian Stams Abbey (Stift Stams), founded in 1273 by Count Meinhard II of Gorizia-Tyrol and his wife.

== Geography ==
Stams is located on the southern shore of the Inn River about 18.50 km (11.50 mi) east of Imst, 7 km (4.3 mi) west of Telfs and 46 km (29 mi) west of the state capital Innsbruck. The village contains Stams has 1300 inhabitants who are living in different parts of the village – called Thannrain, Windfang, Staudach, Haslach, Maehmoos und Hauland.

== History ==
Archaeological findings indicate a church already existed at the site about 700 AD. The locality of Stammes in the Duchy of Bavaria was first mentioned in a 1063 deed, it became a possession of the Counts of Tyrol.

The Meinhardiner count Meinhard II of Gorizia, sole ruler of Tyrol from 1271, established a proprietary monastery together with his wife Elisabeth of Bavaria, widow of the Hohenstaufen king Conrad IV of Germany. The first Cistercian monks descended from Kaisheim in Swabia, itself a filial of Morimond Abbey; they were enfeoffed with extended estates in Silz, Meran and Mals and soon evolved to a spiritual centre of the region. It became the burial place not only of Count Meinhard and his consort, but also of his son Duke Henry of Carinthia, of the Habsburg duke Frederick IV of Austria and his wife Anna of Brunswick, of his son Archduke Sigismund of Austria and his wife Eleanor of Scotland, as well as of Bianca Maria Sforza, second wife of Emperor Maximilian I.

During the 16th-century Protestant Reformation and German Peasants' War the monastic community decayed. In the course of the 1552 rebellion against Emperor Charles V, the premises were plundered by the troops of Elector Maurice of Saxony; even the grave of Maurice' brother Severinus was destroyed. The monastery was largely rebuilt in its present-day Baroque style from the early 17th century onwards, including Wessobrunner stuccowork by Franz Xaver Feuchtmayer.

Stams Abbey was temporarily dissolved in 1807 by order of King Maximilian I Joseph of Bavaria, who had received the Tyrolean lands by the 1805 Peace of Pressburg but re-established after Stams was restored to the Austrian Empire in 1816. Again disseized by the Nazi German authorities upon the Austrian Anschluss in 1938, it was resettled by Cistercian monks after the end of World War II, who established several educational institutions, including the Skigymnasium Stams (Stams ski boarding school), the Kirchliche Pädagogische Hochschule – Edith Stein school of education, and the Meinhardinum gymnasium. The abbey church was elevated to the rank of a minor basilica by Pope John Paul II in 1984.

=== Population ===
Historical population
Year	Pop.	±%
1869	599	—
1880	565	−5.7%
1890	485	−14.2%
1900	496	+2.3%
1910	561	+13.1%
1923	543	−3.2%
1934	635	+16.9%
1939	628	−1.1%
1951	813	+29.5%
1961	1,008	+24.0%
1971	1,054	+4.6%
1981	1,037	−1.6%
1991	1,183	+14.1%
2001	1,261	+6.6%
2011	1,335	+5.9%

== Image gallery ==
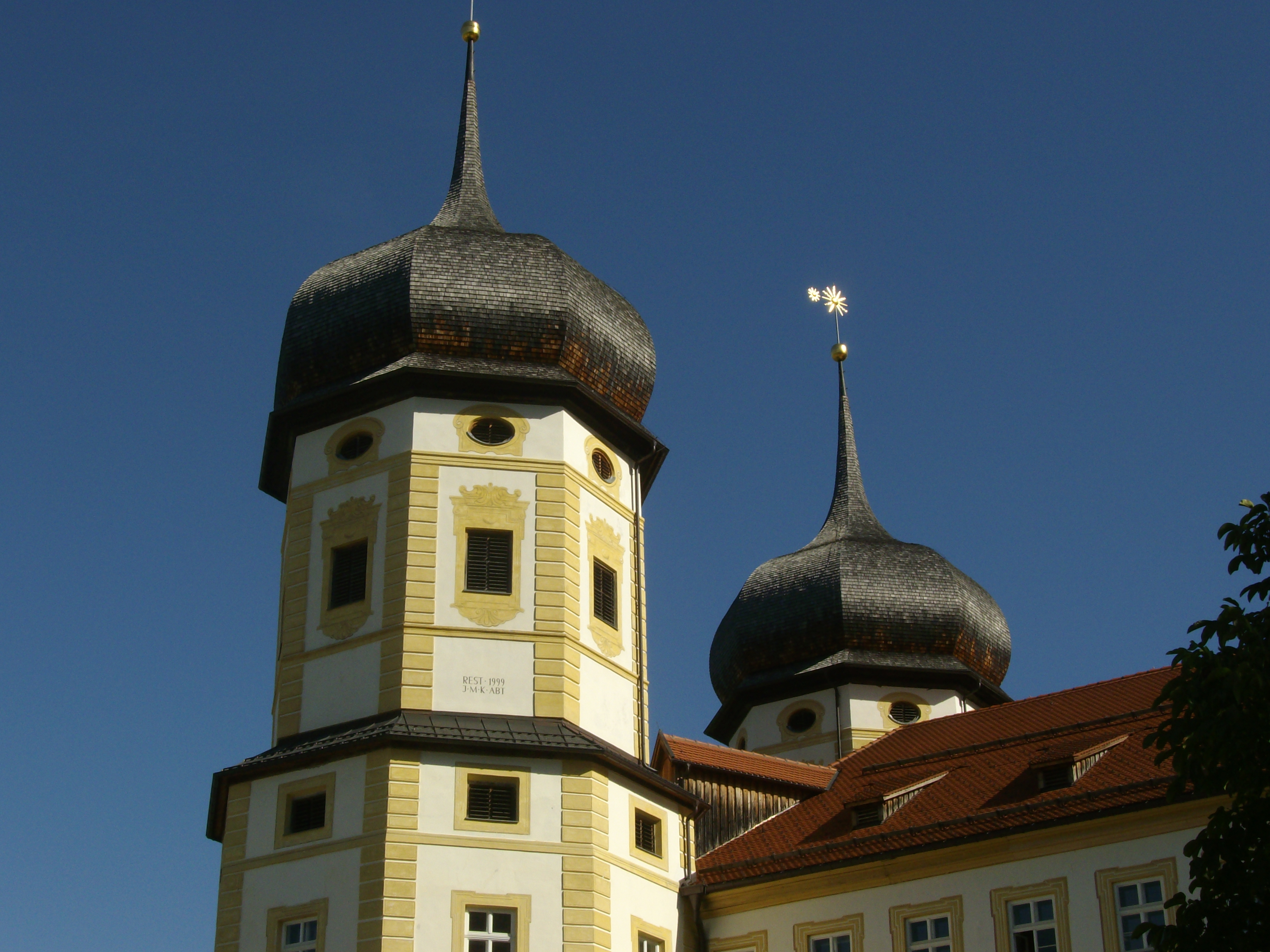
Stams Monastery

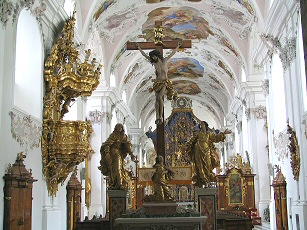
Stams Monastery interior

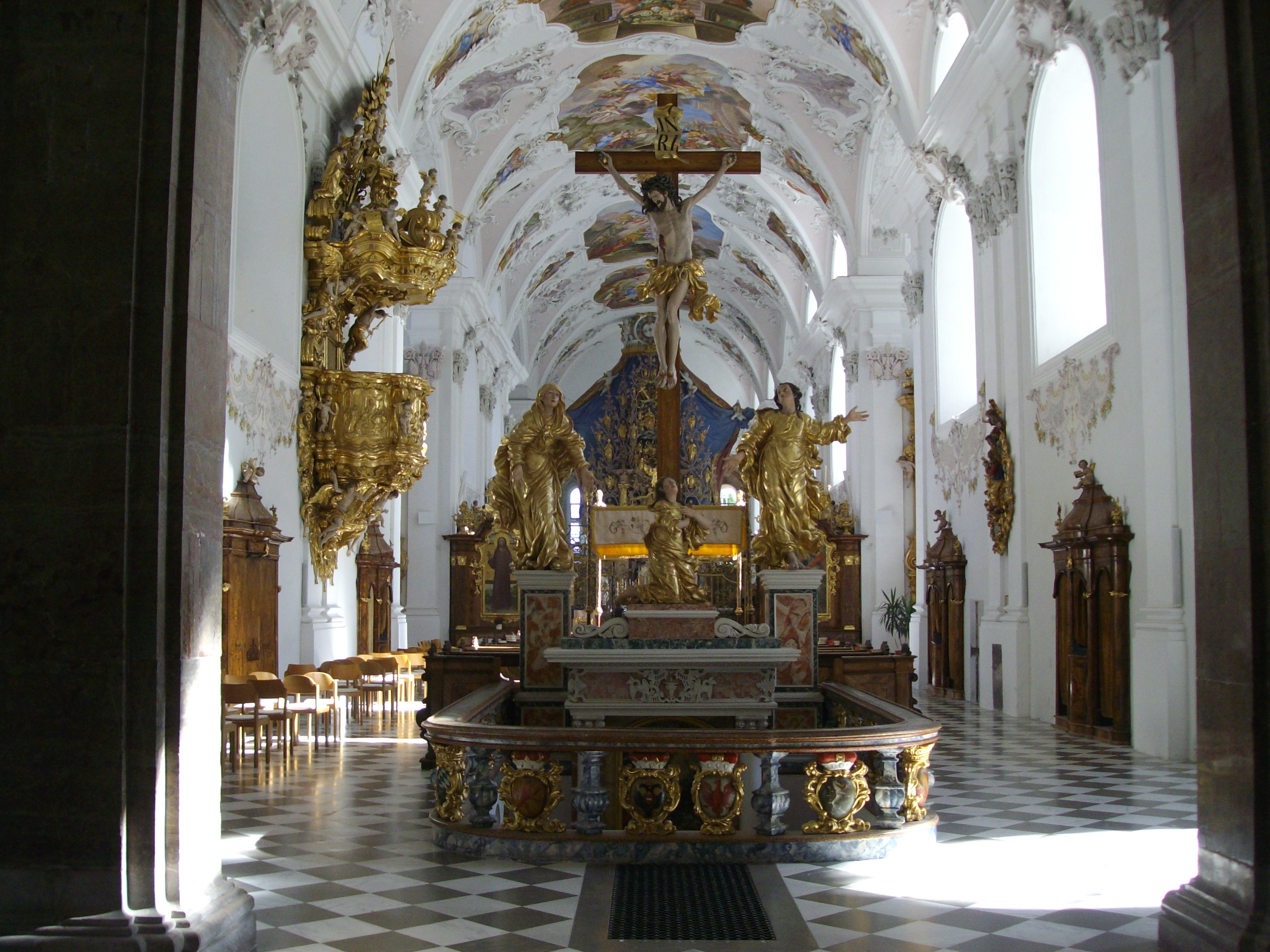
Stams Monastery interior

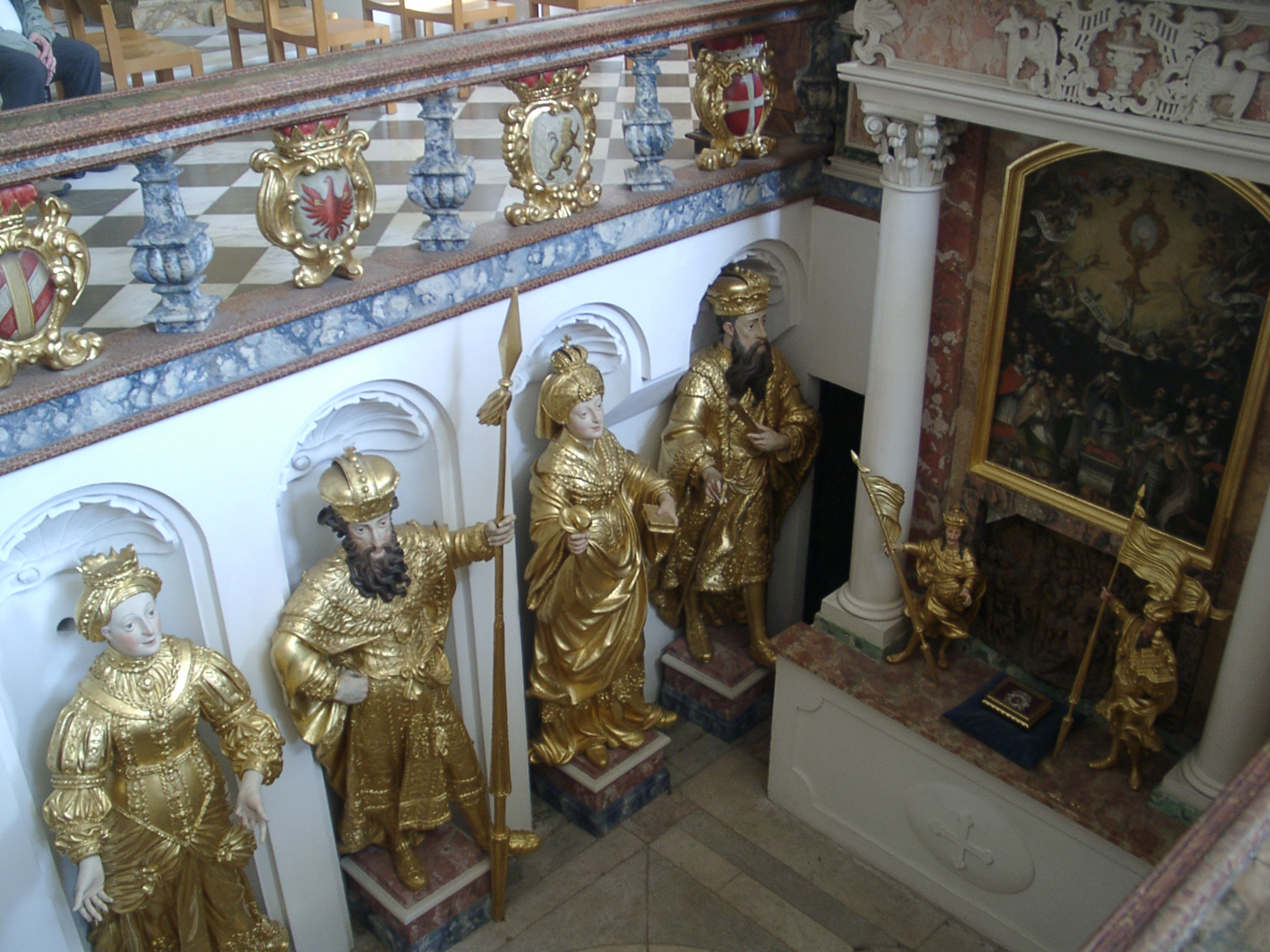
Stams Monastery interior

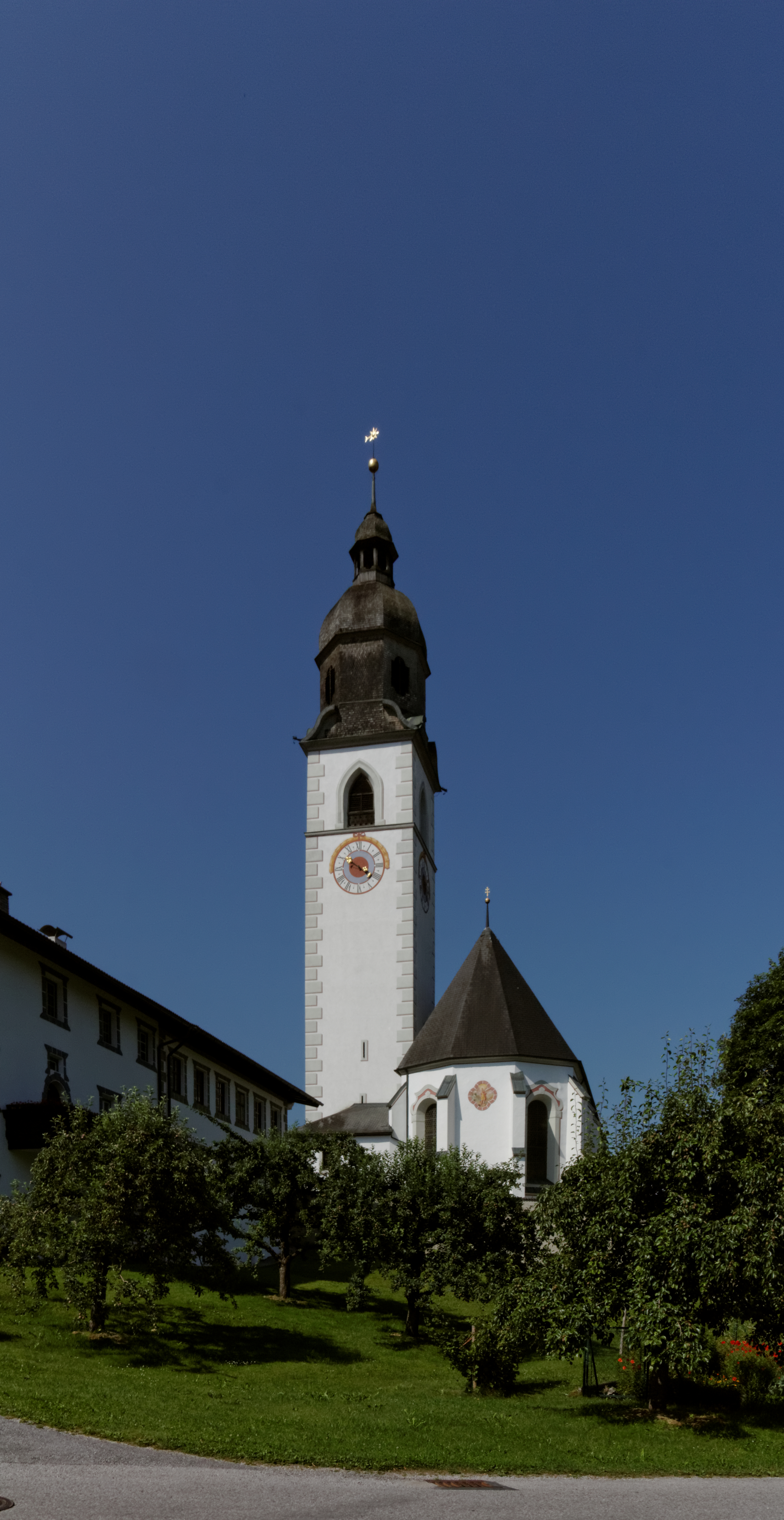
Church Stams

== Twin town ==
Stams is twinned with:

- Kaisheim, Germany, since 1978
