= Otto II of Bavaria =

Duke of Bavaria (1206–1253)

Otto II
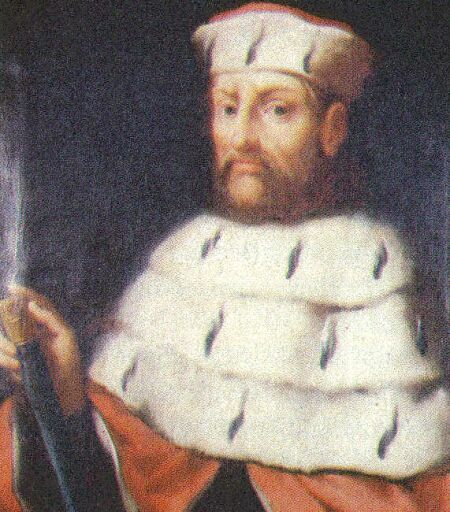

Duke of Bavaria Count Palatine of the Rhine
- Reign: 1231 – 1253
- Predecessor: Louis I
- Successor: Louis II (Upper Bavaria & Rhine); Henry XIII (Lower Bavaria)
- Born: 7 April 1206; Kelheim
- Died: 29 November 1253 (aged 47); Landshut
- Burial: Crypt of Scheyern Abbey
- Spouse: Agnes of the Palatinate
- Issue: Louis II, Duke of Bavaria; Henry XIII, Duke of Bavaria; Elisabeth of Bavaria, Queen of Germany
- House: Wittelsbach
- Father: Louis I Wittelsbach, Duke of Bavaria
- Mother: Ludmilla of Bohemia

Otto II (7 April 1206 – 29 November 1253), called the Illustrious (German: der Erlauchte), was the Duke of Bavaria from 1231 and Count Palatine of the Rhine from 1228. He was the son of Louis I and Ludmilla of Bohemia and a member of the Wittelsbach dynasty.

The poet Reinbot von Dürne was active at his court.

== Life ==
Otto was born at Kelheim.

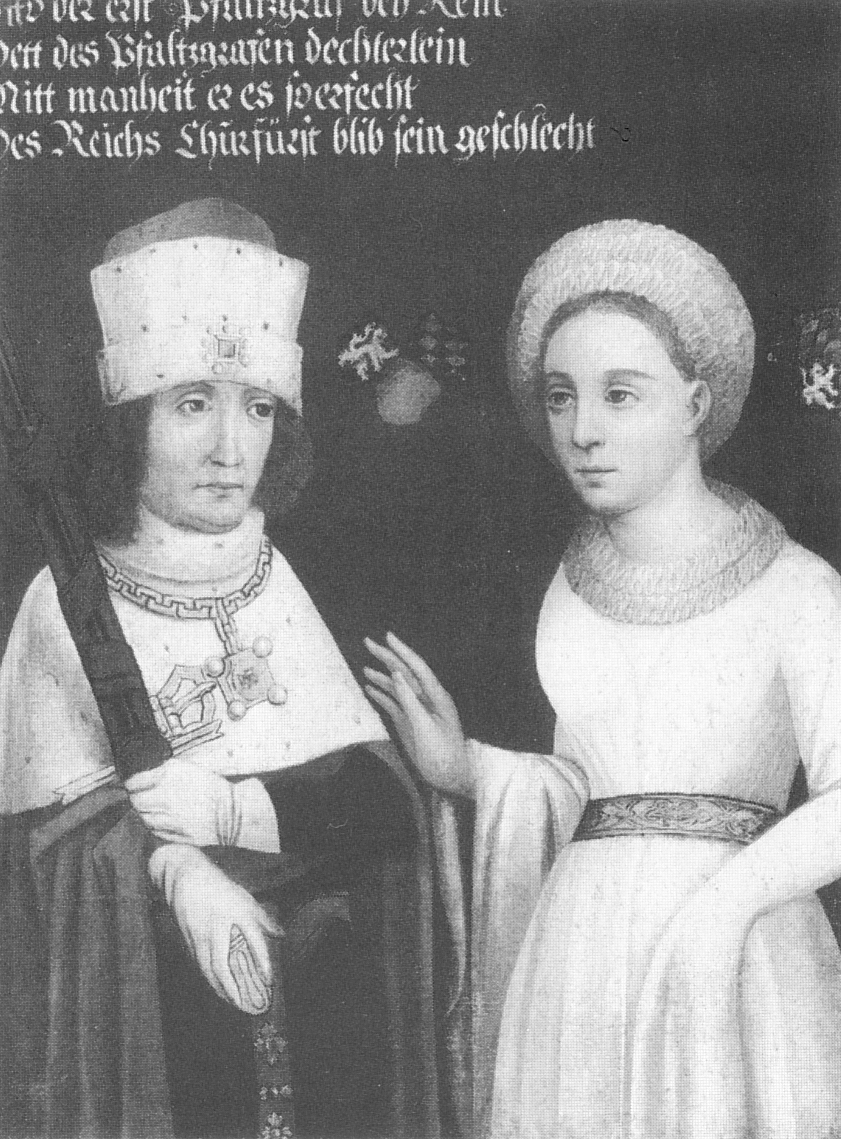
Otto II, Duke of Bavaria, Count Palatine of the Rhine, with his wife Agnes of the Palatinate; oil painting after an original of the 15th century.

At the age of sixteen, he was married to Agnes of the Palatinate, a granddaughter of Duke Henry the Lion and Conrad of Hohenstaufen. With this marriage, the Wittelsbach inherited the Palatinate and kept it as a Wittelsbach possession until 1918. Since that time also the lion has become a heraldic symbol in the coat of arms for Bavaria and the Palatinate.

Otto acquired the rich regions of Bogen in 1240, and Andechs and Ortenburg in 1248 as possessions for the Wittelsbach and extended his power base in Bavaria this way. With the county of Bogen the Wittelsbach acquired also the white and blue coloured lozenge flag which since that time has been the flag of Bavaria (and of the Palatinate).

After a dispute with emperor Frederick II was ended, he joined the Hohenstaufen party in 1241. His daughter, Elizabeth, was married to Frederick's son Conrad IV. Because of this, Otto was excommunicated by the pope.

He died in Landshut in 1253. Like his forefathers, Otto was buried in the crypt of Scheyern Abbey.

== Family and children ==
Otto married Agnes, the daughter of Henry V, Count Palatine of the Rhine (a son of Henry the Lion) and Agnes of Hohenstaufen, in Worms in 1222. Their children were:

1. Louis II, Duke of Bavaria (13 April 1229, Heidelberg – 2 February 1294, Heidelberg).
2. Henry XIII, Duke of Bavaria (19 November 1235, Landshut – 3 February 1290, Burghausen.
3. Elisabeth of Bavaria, Queen of Germany (c. 1227, Landshut – 9 October 1273)
4. Sophie (1236, Landshut – 9 August 1289, Castle Hirschberg), married 1258 to Count Gerhard IV of Sulzbach and Hirschberg.
5. Agnes (c. 1240–c. 1306), Nun in Segenstal Abbey

Otto had a daughter who died young and whose name is not known. The Annales sancti Rudberti Salisburgenses record her betrothal in 1235 to Conrad, who later married Elisabeth.

Otto II of Bavaria House of Wittelsbach Born: 1206 Died: 1253
German royalty
Preceded by Louis I	Duke of Bavaria; 1231-1253	Succeeded by Louis II and Henry XIII
Preceded by Louis I	Count Palatine of the Rhine; 1228–1253	Succeeded by Louis II
