= Meinhard of Carinthia =

Duke of Carinthia (c. 1238–1295)

Meinhard II of Gorizia–Tyrol
- Duke of Carinthia
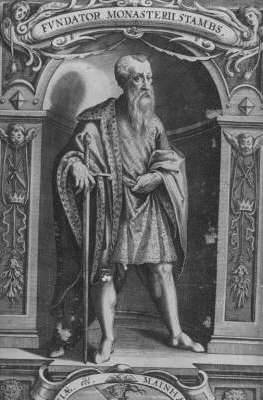
- Meinhard II, founder of Stams Monastery, 18th century depiction
- Duke: 1286–1295
- Predecessor: Rudolf I of Germany
- Successor: Otto III
- Born: c. 1238
- Died: 1 November 1295; Greifenburg, Carinthia
- Noble family: House of Gorizia
- Spouse: Elisabeth of Bavaria
- Issue: Elisabeth of Carinthia; Otto III, Duke of Carinthia; Albert II; Louis; Henry of Bohemia
- Father: Meinhard I of Gorizia-Tyrol
- Mother: Adelheid of Tyrol

Meinhard II (c. 1238 – 1 November 1295), a member of the House of Gorizia (Meinhardiner), ruled the County of Gorizia (as Meinhard IV) and the County of Tyrol together with his younger brother Albert from 1258. In 1271 they divided their heritage and Meinhard became sole ruler of Tyrol. In 1286 he was enfeoffed with the Duchy of Carinthia and the adjacent March of Carniola.

== Life ==
Meinhard II was the son of Count Meinhard III of Gorizia and his wife Adelheid (died 1275–79), daughter and heiress of Count Albert IV of Tyrol. His father had acquired the County of Tyrol (as Meinhard I) upon the death of his father-in-law in 1253 and already had attempted to gain control over neighbouring Carinthian lands against the forces of Duke Bernhard von Spanheim. However, he was defeated near Greifenburg and had to leave his minor sons Meinhard II and Albert held in hostage by Duke Bernhard's son, Archbishop-elect Philip of Salzburg. After their father's death in 1258, Meinhard II and his brother emerged from the Salzburg custody at Hohenwerfen Castle to secure their Gorizia-Tyrol heritage. In 1259 Meinhard married Elisabeth of Wittelsbach, the widow of the Hohenstaufen king Conrad IV of Germany, about ten years his senior.

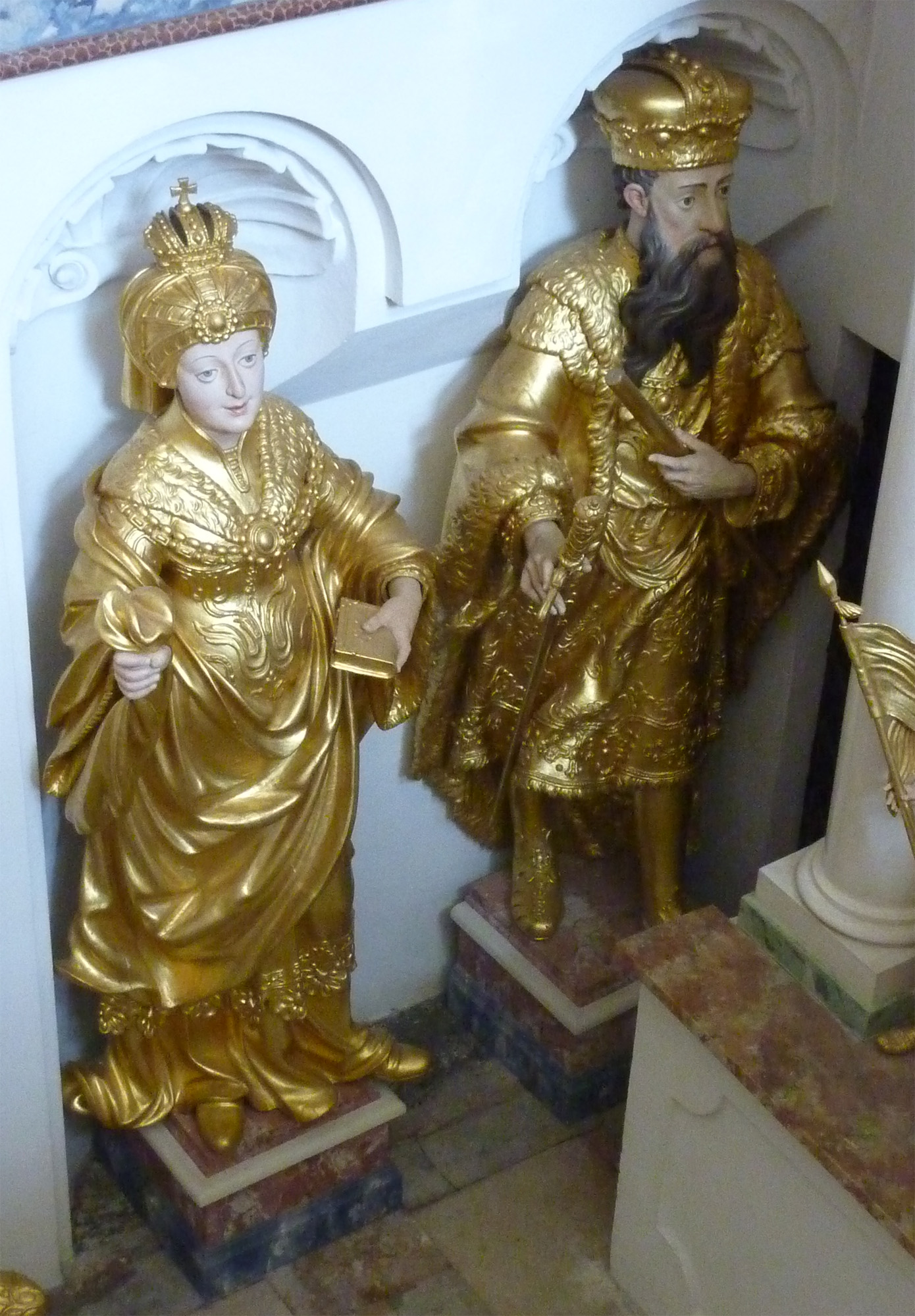
Statues of Meinhard and Elisabeth in the Stams Abbey Church

The joint rule with Albert came to an end, when the inheritance rights to Gorizia and Tyrol were divided in 1271. Meinhard received the County of Tyrol, becoming the progenitor of the Gorizia-Tyrol line of the Meinhardiner dynasty. He and his wife Elisabeth founded Stams Abbey as a proprietary monastery in 1273. The count struggled to acquire the lordship over the prince-bishoprics of Trento and Brixen, extended his Tyrolean lands down the Adige River to Salorno, and also acquired several territories in the Inn valley including the important salt mines around Hall. He turned out to be a capable ruler, and therefore is known as the creator of Tyrol as an autonomous Imperial State. Meinhard also had roads built and coins minted, especially the silver coin Zwainziger (twenty). The type was copied elsewhere in Europe and became widely known as Groschen.

Already in 1267 Count Meinhard had once again tried to strengthen the ties with the Hohenstaufen dynasty by accompanying his stepson, Conradin of Swabia, on his campaign to Italy. However, after Conradin's defeat at the Battle of Tagliacozzo and his execution in 1268, he had to seek new allies. He became a close associate of Count Rudolf of Habsburg, who was elected King of the Romans in 1273, and stuck in a fierce conflict with the mighty king Ottokar II of Bohemia around several "alienated" Imperial territories, which Ottokar had acquired during the preceding interregnum. In 1276 Meinhard married his daughter Elisabeth off to Rudolf's eldest son, Albert.

Meinhard backed Rudolf's campaign against Ottokar and in turn received Carinthia with the Carniolan march as a pledge in 1276. After Ottokar's defeat in the 1278 Battle on the Marchfeld, King Rudolf formally elevated Meinhard to a Prince of the Holy Roman Empire and finally vested him with the Duchy of Carinthia as a fief at the Imperial Diet of Augsburg in 1286. On September 1, Meinhard was enthroned at the Duke's Chair and thus becoming the first Carinthian duke of the Gorizia-Tyrol dynasty. In 1286–9 Meinhard issued a vernacular Tyrolean Landrecht, albeit only fragmentarily transmitted upon today. As far as it can be ascertained, he had no ancestry in earlier Carinthian ducal families, whereas he was a distant descendant of some early Meranian lords of Istria and Carniola. His investiture of the duchy included a provision that in extinction of his male line, the House of Habsburg would be its heir. This materialized in 1335 upon the death of his son Henry. The Habsburgs also acquired the County of Tyrol from Henry's daughter Margaret in 1363.

Meinhard died in 1295 at Greifenburg in Carinthia. His younger son Henry succeeded him as Carinthian duke and in 1307 was even elected King of Bohemia; his eldest daughter Elisabeth by her marriage with Albert of Habsburg became German queen in 1298.

== Marriage and children ==
Meinhard's wife from 1258 was Elisabeth of Wittelsbach, the daughter of Duke Otto II of Bavaria and widow of King Conrad IV of Germany. Thus he was the stepfather of Conradin of Hohenstaufen, Duke of Swabia and claimant of the Kingdom of Sicily, who was executed in 1268.

Meinhard and Elisabeth had the following children:

1. Elisabeth (1262–1312), married Albert of Habsburg, Duke of Austria and Styria from 1282, King of Germany from 1298
2. Otto III (c. 1265–1310), Duke of Carinthia and Count of Tyrol, married Euphemia (c. 1278–1347), daughter of the Piast duke Henry V of Legnica
3. Albert II, Count of Tyrol, died 1292, married Agnes of Hohenberg in 1281, daughter of Albert II of Hohenberg-Rotenburg (c. 1235–98), Count of Hohenberg and Haigerloch, who belonged to a cadet branch of the Hohenzollern dynasty. Their daughter, Margaret of Görz-Tyrol (died after 1348), married Frederick IV of Nuremberg, Burgrave of Nuremberg, (1287–1332).
4. Louis, Duke of Carinthia and Count of Tyrol, died 1305
5. Henry (c. 1270–1335), Duke of Carinthia and Count of Tyrol, married Anne Přemyslovna, daughter of the King Wenceslaus II of Bohemia, without issue; became King of Bohemia in 1306 and 1307–10, later father of Countess Margaret of Tyrol from his marriage with Adelaide of Brunswick, married a third and last time with Beatrice of Savoy, without issue.
6. Agnes (died 1293), married the Wettin margrave Frederick of Meissen, a grandson of Emperor Frederick II; her only son Frederick the Lame predeceased his father.

== Bibliography ==
- Hermann Wiesflecker, Meinhard der Zweite. Tirol, Kärnten und ihre Nachbarländer am Ende des 13. Jhs. (Schlern-Schriften 124). Innsbruck: Wagner 1955, Reprint 1995.
- Eines Fürsten Traum. Meinhard II.—Das Werden Tirols. Catalogue, Dorf Tirol—Innsbruck 1995.
- Patrouch, Joseph F. (2010). Queen's Apprentice Archduchess Elizabeth, Empress María, the Habsburgs, and the Holy Roman Empire, 1554-1569. Brill.
- Štih, Peter (2010). The Middle Ages between the Eastern Alps and the Northern Adriatic: Select Papers on Slovene Historiography and Medieval History. Brill.

Meinhard of Carinthia House of Gorizia Born: c. 1240 Died: 1 April 1304
Preceded by Meinhard I	Count of Gorizia; 1258–1271 with Albert I (1258–1271)	Succeeded by Albert I
Preceded by Meinhard I	Count of Tyrol; 1258–1295 with Albert I	Succeeded by Henry VI; Otto III; Louis
Preceded by Rudolf I	Duke of Carinthia; Margrave of Carniola; 1286–1295	Succeeded by Henry VI; Otto III; Louis
