= Elisabeth of Bavaria, Queen of Germany =

13th-century Queen of Germany, Sicily, and Jerusalem

Elisabeth of Bavaria
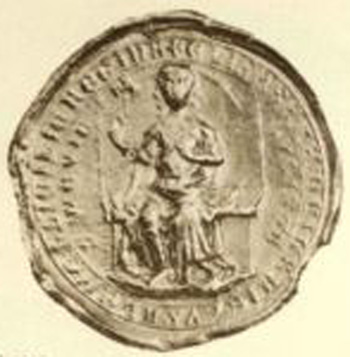
- Seal of Elisabeth of Bavaria.

Queen consort of Germany and Jerusalem
- Tenure: 1 September 1246 – 21 May 1254

Queen consort of Sicily
- Tenure: 13 December 1250 – 21 May 1254
- Born: c. 1227; Trausnitz Castle, Landshut, Bavaria
- Died: 9 October 1273 (aged 45–46); Goyen Castle, Schenna, Tyrol
- Burial: Stams Abbey
- Spouse: Conrad IV, King of Germany; Meinhard, Duke of Carinthia
- Issue: Conradin, King of Sicily; Elizabeth, Queen of Germany; Otto III, Duke of Carinthia; Henry, King of Bohemia
- House: House of Wittelsbach
- Father: Otto II, Duke of Bavaria
- Mother: Agnes of the Palatinate

Elisabeth of Bavaria (c. 1227 – 9 October 1273) was Queen of Germany and Jerusalem from 1246 to 1254 by her marriage to King Conrad IV of Germany.

== Life ==
Elisabeth was born at Trausnitz Castle in Landshut, the eldest daughter of Otto II Wittelsbach and his wife Agnes of the Palatinate, herself a daughter of the Welf count palatine Henry V and Agnes of Hohenstaufen.

Otto II succeeded his father Louis I as Bavarian duke and as Count palatine in 1231. In the conflict between the Hohenstaufen emperor Frederick II and the Roman Curia, he initially sided with the pope, but became a supporter of Frederick in 1241. Otto II had initially betrothed Elisabeth to Duke Frederick II of Austria, however, the new political alliance would lead to the marriage of the elder daughter of the Wittelsbach and the elder son of the Hohenstaufen, Conrad IV. The wedding ceremony took place on 1 September 1246, probably at Vohburg in Bavaria, against fierce protests by the papal legate Albert von Behaim.

Conrad IV had inherited the title of a King of Jerusalem from his mother Isabella II of Jerusalem. Appointed Duke of Swabia in 1235, he was elected King of the Romans in 1237 to represent his father in his German dominions. Upon Frederick's death on 13 December 1250, still involved in a war against Pope Innocent IV and his allies, he also succeeded him as King of Sicily. He would continue the war and left for Sicily in 1251, leaving his wife behind, who gave birth to their only child Conradin in March next year. On 21 May 1254 Conrad IV died of malaria at his army camp in Lavello, Basilicata, without ever having seen his son.

During the interregnum after the death of Emperor Frederick II, Elisabeth tried to secure the rights of her minor son Conradin, backed by her brothers, the Bavarian dukes Henry XIII and Louis II. In 1256 Elisabeth had to witness the execution of Louis' wife Maria of Brabant, whereafter she gave Conradin to the Bishop of Constance for care and education. Beset by intriguing Pope Alexander VI, she agreed to appoint Conradin's uncle Manfred, an illegitimate son of Frederick, regent in the Kingdom of Sicily on her son's behalf. However, she could not prevent the election of Richard of Cornwall as King of the Romans in 1256/57.

Elisabeth remained a widow for five years. On 6 October 1259 in Munich, she married her second husband Count Meinhard II of Gorizia–Tyrol, a member of the Meinhardiner dynasty, who became Duke of Carinthia in 1286. Her second husband, just released from custody by Archbishop Philip of Salzburg, was of inferior status and about ten years younger than her, nevertheless his Tyrolean domains comprised the strategically important mountain passes across the Alps to Italy. The couple had six surviving children.

Elisabeth's relationship to her firstborn son Conradin remained a reserved one. When Charles of Anjou defeated Manfred of Sicily in the 1266 Battle of Benevento, her brother Louis and her husband Meinhard encouraged Conradin's decision to go on campaign. In August 1267, mother and son met for a last time at Hohenschwangau Castle before Conradin left for Italy, together with his uncle and his stepfather, who however deserted him in Verona. After Elisabeth heard of his defeat and execution in 1268, she had the Santa Maria del Carmine Church erected in Naples in his memory. In 1272 she founded the Cistercian abbey of Stams in Tyrol, together with her husband Meinhard, where she is also buried.

== Marriages and children ==
Elisabeth and Conrad had:

- Conradin (25 March 1252 – 29 October 1268)

Elisabeth and her second husband Meinhard had six children:

- Elisabeth of Gorizia-Tyrol (1262–1312), wife of Albert I, Duke of Austria (1248–1308), became queen consort of the Romans in 1298.
- Otto III of Carinthia (d. 1310), father of Elisabeth of Carinthia (1298–1352), queen-consort of Sicily as wife of Peter II of Sicily (1304-1342).
- Albert II, died 1292.
- Louis, died 1305.
- Henry I (c. 1270–1335), King of Bohemia 1306 and 1307–10, Duke of Carinthia 1310–35, Count of Tyrol
- Agnes of Carinthia (d. 1293), wife of Frederick I, Margrave of Meissen (1257–1323), grandson of Emperor Frederick II (1194-1250), her only son Frederick of Meissen (9 May 1293 – 13 January 1315, Zwenkau) predeceased his father.

== Sources ==
- Arnold, Benjamin (1991a). Count and Bishop in Medieval Germany: A Study of Regional Power, 1100-1350. University of Pennsylvania Press.
- Arnold, Benjamin (1991b). Princes and Territories in Medieval Germany. Cambridge University Press.

Elisabeth of Bavaria House of Wittelsbach Born: circa 1227 Died: 9 October 1273
Royal titles
Vacant Title last held by Maria Komnene	Queen consort of Jerusalem; 1 September 1246 – 21 May 1254	Vacant Title next held by Isabella of Ibelin
Vacant Title last held by Isabella of England	Queen consort of Germany; 1 September 1246 – 21 May 1254	Vacant Title next held by Gertrude of Hohenberg
Vacant Title last held by Isabella of England	Queen consort of Sicily; 13 December 1250 – 21 May 1254	Vacant Title next held by Helena Angelina Doukaina
