= Otto III of Carinthia =

Count of Gorizia and Tyrol and Duke of Carinthia (1265–1310)

Otto III
- Duke of Carinthia
- Born: c. 1265
- Died: 25 May 1310
- Noble family: Meinhardiner
- Spouse: Euphemia of Legnica
- Father: Meinhard, Duke of Carinthia
- Mother: Elisabeth of Bavaria

Otto III (c. 1265 – 25 May 1310), a member of the House of Gorizia (Meinhardiner dynasty), was Duke of Carinthia and Count of Tyrol from 1295 until his death. He ruled jointly with his younger brothers Louis and Henry VI.

== Life ==
Otto was a son of Duke Meinhard of Carinthia and his wife Elisabeth of Bavaria, widow of the Hohenstaufen king Conrad IV of Germany. His father was enfeoffed with the Carinthian duchy by King Rudolf I of Germany in 1286, in turn for his support of the Habsburgs against King Ottokar II of Bohemia. Otto's sister Elizabeth was married to Rudolf's son Albert of Habsburg and became German queen in 1298.

When Duke Meinhard died in 1295, his sons inherited a well-organized country, as their father had laid the foundation for an efficient administration by fostering ministeriales and creating the Tyrolean Raitbuch (internal record book). Otto signed a border treaty with the neighbouring Bishopric of Brixen, establishing the confluence of the Adige and the Avisio as the border between Tyrol and Brixen. Otto's brothers Albert (d. 1292), Louis and Henry VI were appointed Vogts of the Bishops of Trent.

Otto's brother-in-law Albert of Habsburg, elected King of the Romans in 1298, granted him several tolls. However, Otto's lavish court was a burden on his finances. Most notable of his economic policies was the expansion and securing of the market in Gries (now part of Bolzano) in 1305 competing with the market in the central town of Bolzano, which was dominated by the bishop.

Otto died in 1310 without a male heir. As his brothers Albert and Louis had already died in 1292 and 1305, respectively, he was succeeded by his youngest brother, Duke Henry VI.

== Seal ==
Otto's seal shows a horseman and bears the subsequent inscription in uncial script: OTTO DEI GRACIA DUX KARINTHIE TIROLIS ET GORICIE COMES AQUILEGENSIS / TRIDENTINE BRISINENSIS ECLESIARU[M] ADVOCATUS.

== Marriage and issue ==
In 1297 Otto married Duchess Euphemia (1281–1347), a daughter of the Silesian duke Henry V of Legnica. They had four daughters:

- Anna (c. 1300 – 1331 or 35), married Count Palatine Rudolf II;
- Elisabeth (d. c. 1352), married King Peter II of Sicily;
- Ursula (d. 1327) and
- Euphemia (d. 1329 or 39).

== Sources ==
- Kersken, Norbert (2021). "Poland and the Polish People in Late Medieval German Historiography". In Pleszczynski, Andrzej; Vercamer, Grischa (eds.). Germans and Poles in the Middle Ages. Brill.
- Obermair, Hannes (2005). Bozen Süd—Bolzano Nord. Schriftlichkeit und urkundliche Überlieferung der Stadt Bozen bis 1500—Scritturalità e documentazione archivistica della città di Bolzano fino al 1500. Regesten der kommunalen Bestände (in German). Vol. 1. Bozen-Bolzano: Stadtgemeinde Bozen. p. 249, No. 223. ISBN 88-901870-0-X.
- Štih, Peter (2010). The Middle Ages between the Eastern Alps and the Northern Adriatic: Select Papers on Slovene Historiography and Medieval History. Brill.

Otto III of Carinthia House of Gorizia Born: around 1265 Died: 25 May 1310
Preceded by Meinhard	Duke of Carinthia; Margrave of Carniola; 1295–1310	Succeeded by Henry VI
Preceded by Meinhard	Count of Tyrol; 1295–1310	Succeeded by Henry VI
