= Frederick Henry's Meuse campaign =

Campaign in 1632

Meuse campaign
- Part of the Eighty Years' War
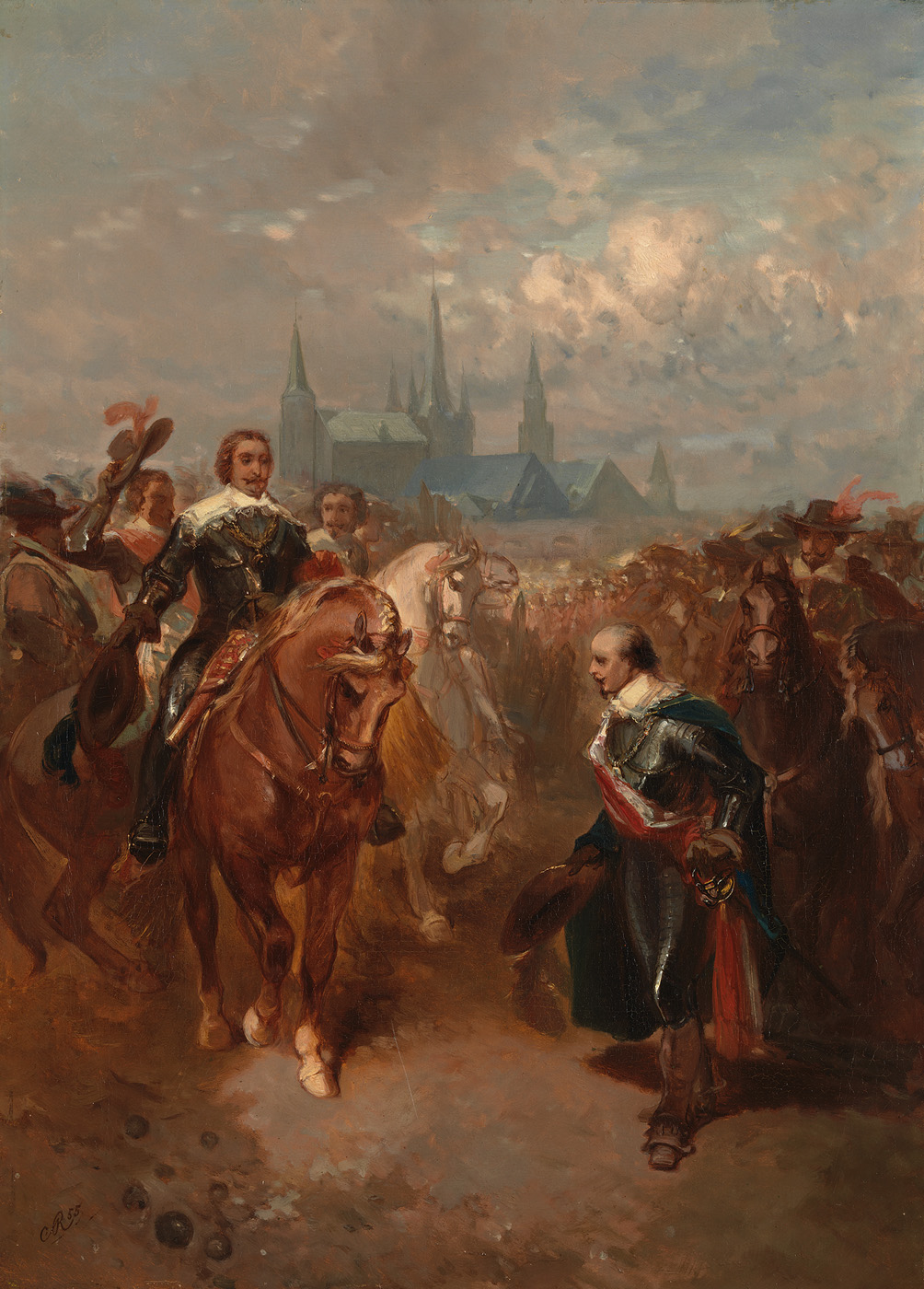
- The Capture of Maastricht was the most prominent siege during the Meuse campaign. 1855 painting by Charles Rochussen.
Date	1 June – 22 August 1632
Location	Along the Meuse
Result	Dutch victory

Belligerents
Dutch Republic	Spain; Imperial Army (Note: Imperial troops participated in the Siege of Maastricht)

Commanders and leaders
(Dutch Republic) Frederick Henry (Dutch Republic) Ernest Casimir † (Dutch Republic) Horace Vere	(Spanish Empire) Guillaume de Bette (Spanish Empire) Lelio Brancaccio (Spanish Empire) Gonzalo de Córdoba (Holy Roman Empire) Graf zu Pappenheim

Strength
Maastricht: 17,000 infantry 4,000 cavalry Roermond: 20,000 men Venlo: Unknown	Maastricht: 20,000 infantry 6,000 cavalry 3,000 armed citizens Roermond: A garrison of 300 men Venlo: Unknown

The Meuse campaign was a major operation during the Dutch Revolt led by Frederick Henry, Prince of Orange in which he took the cities of Venlo, Roermond, Sittard and Maastricht.

== Background ==
In 1572, 6 years after the revolt broke out, the Geuzen who backed the Prince of Orange, captured a lot of cities in the Netherlands. Including the cities which were key locations for this campaign. The aftermath of this being that the Union of Utrecht was proclaimed in 1579.

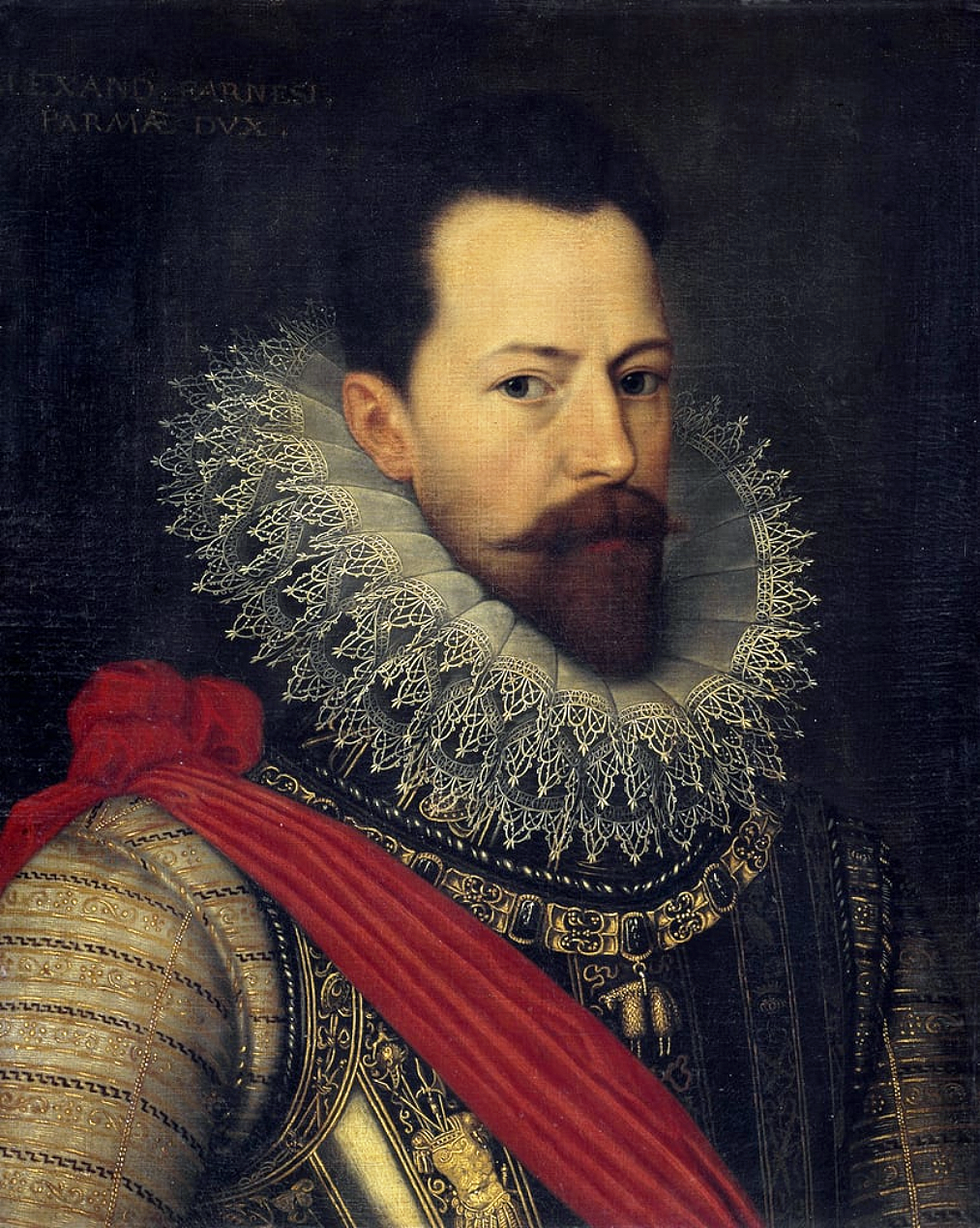
The Duke of Parma

Shortly after, Philip II sent the Duke of Parma to the Netherlands as governor and reconquered large parts of the Netherlands previously occupied and captured by the Rebels, including the cities that were captured during the Meuse campaign, the most notable one being Parma's siege of Maastricht.

Later in 1588, Maurice, Frederick's half-brother, became the Prince of Orange. After implementing military reforms, he conquered large parts of the territories previously captured by Parma, except for the cities that would be taken during this campaign.

The military situation of the Eighty Years' War in 1629

In 1629, a few years before the initial campaign, Frederick Henry besieged and captured 's-Hertogenbosch, this would be known as his greatest achievement. 's-Hertogenbosch was the final Spanish-held city standing before Frederick could initiate his campaign. Its capture allowed Frederick to launch his offensive.

== Campaign ==
=== Siege of Venlo ===
The Siege of Venlo was the first major action of the campaign. This siege lasted from 1 June until 4 June when the garrison in Venlo was forced to capitulate.

=== Siege of Roermond ===
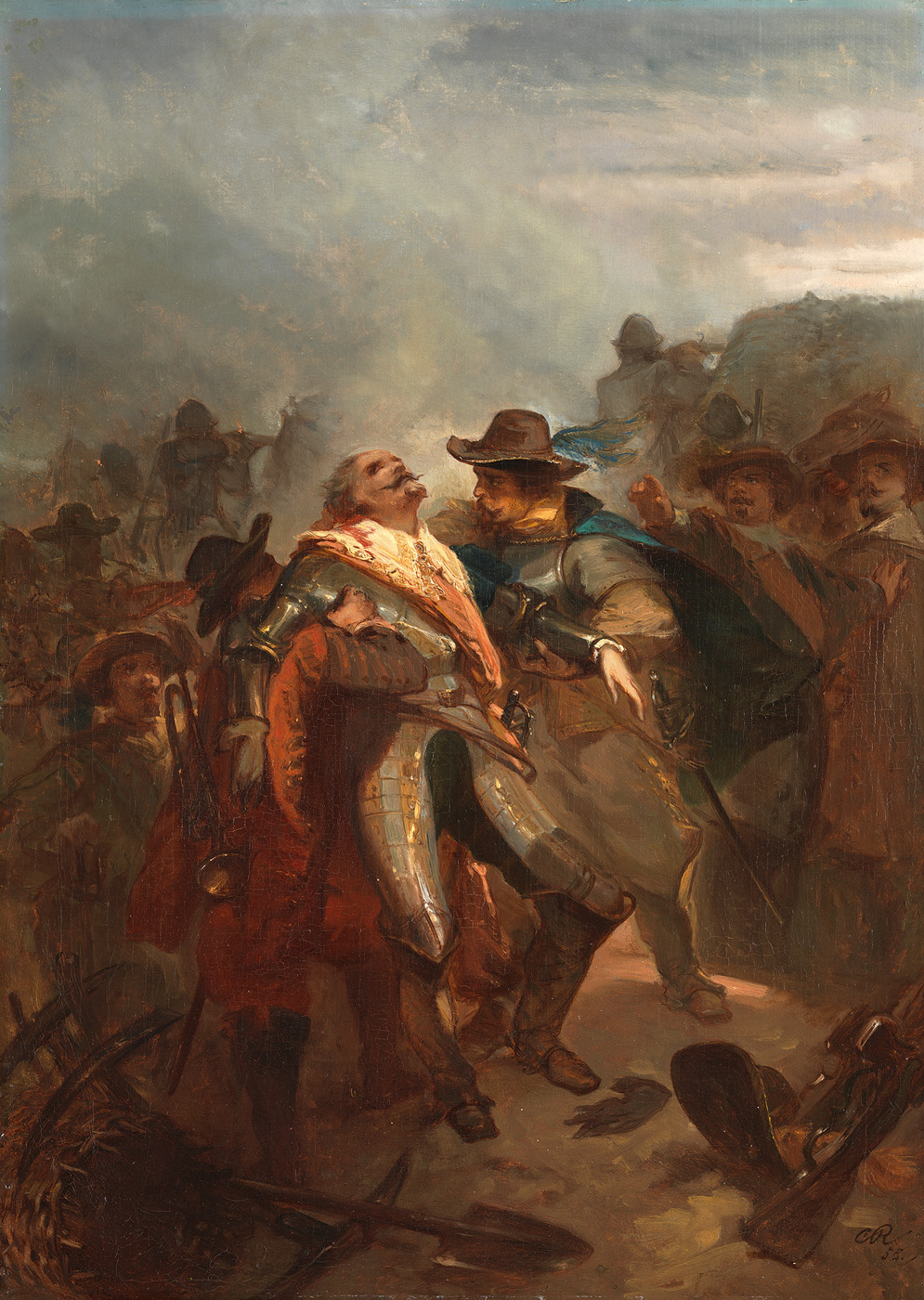
The death of Ernest Casimir during the siege of Roermond

The Siege of Roermond occurred on 2 June until 5 June when a Dutch force of 20,000 men took on a Spanish garrison of around 300 men and forced the garrison to capitulate. Even though the Dutch Army successfully took the city of Roermond, the Dutch still suffered a heavy loss due to the death of Ernest Casimir when he got shot when inspecting a nearby trench.

Ernest arrived at Roermond on the 2nd of June, a few hours later he was inspecting their respective trenches when he got hit with a bullet, killing him. After Venlo was captured, Frederick Henry heard about his death and arrived at Roermond with his entire army on the 4th of June.

During the same morning, the officials of Roermond met at the town hall to discuss a surrender of the city. The same afternoon, a letter was presented which included the surrender of the city.

The day after, the city capitulated under a few conditions, the most important ones being:

1. Roermond was obligated to provide a Church for the Protestants.
2. All civilians had to be protected and preserved in their privileges, right and ancient origins.
3. The public practice of Catholicism and the city's income was to be respected.
4. The garrison stationed in Roermond had to leave to Rheinberg.

After Frederick entered the city on the 6th of June, the mayor Bossman presented him the keys of the city on the local market.

=== Siege of Maastricht ===
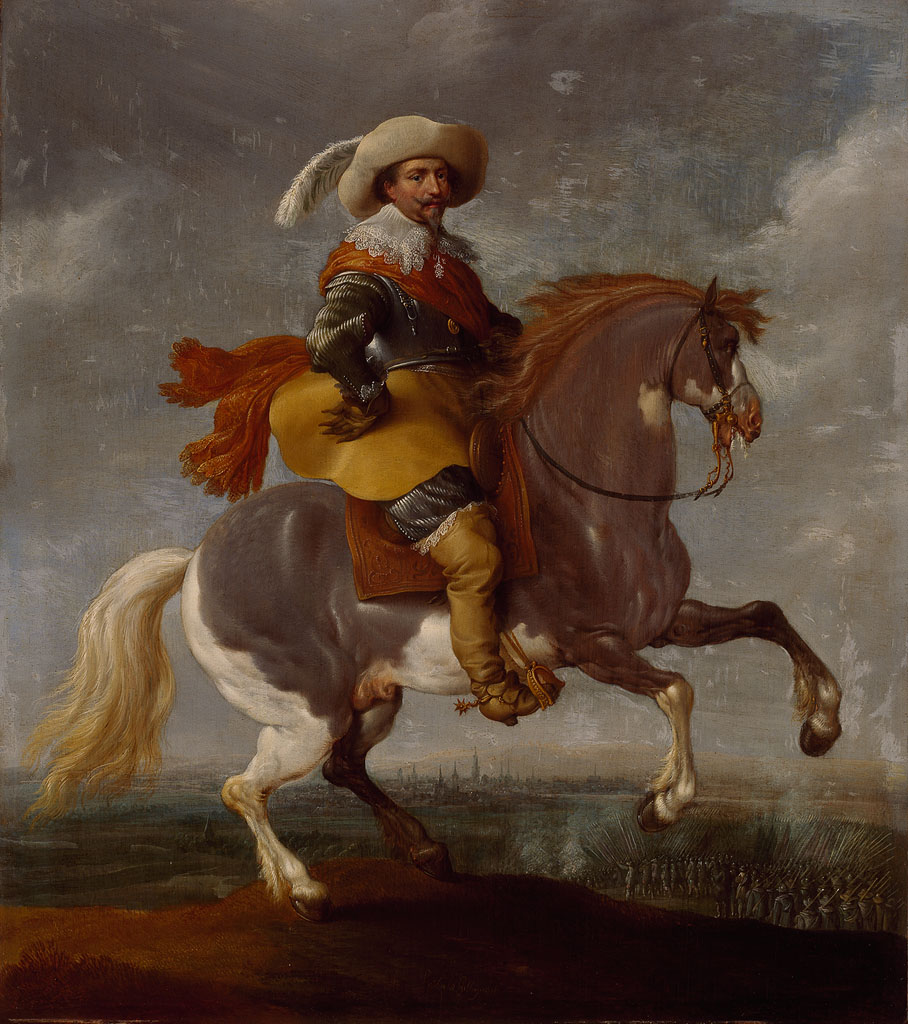
This illustration shows Frederick Henry in front of the besieged city of Maastricht

The siege of Maastricht was the last and most major military action during the campaign. The siege itself lasted from 9 June until 22 August, the siege was fought between the Dutch States Army led by Frederick and Horace Vere and the combined forces of the Spanish and Imperial armies. The outnumbered Dutch forces successfully besieged the city, bringing it under Dutch control.

== Aftermath ==
Even though the campaign was a success for the Dutch, the cities of Venlo and Roermond would be recaptured by Spanish forces under Cardinal-Infante Ferdinand during his counter-offensive in the summer of 1637. The Cardinal-Infante would also fully cut off Maastricht through doing so and prevent any further Dutch attacks from the Meuse in the future. The city of Maastricht would be besieged again in 1634 by Spanish forces, but without success. The campaign resulted in Maastricht falling entirely into Dutch hands. Maastricht would become one of the most important Dutch fortresses and was besieged in 1673, 1676, 1748, 1793 and 1794.

== Sources ==
- Roberts, Andrew (2020). De grootste veldheren uit de vroegmoderne tijd, 1584-1865 (E-book ed.). VBK Media. ISBN 978-94-019-1730-8.
- Kollewijn, A.M. (1878). Leerboek der vaderlandsche geschiedenis, Volume 1 (E-Book ed.).
- Graddesz Hellinga, Gerben (2016). Geschiedenis van Oranje: de canon van ons Koninklijk Huis (E-book ed.). Amsterdam University Press. ISBN 978-94-6249-202-8.
- Wagenaar, Jan (1754). Vaderlandsche historie: vervattende de geschiedenissen der nu Vereenigde Nederlanden, inzonderheid die van Holland, van de vroegste tyden af: Uit de geloofwaardigste schryvers en egte gedenkstukken samengesteld. Met konstplaaten en kaarten opgehelderd, Volume 11 (E-book ed.).
- Vereeniging "Die Haghe" (1896). Catalogus van de tentoonstelling ter herinnering aan den 300jarigen geboortedag van Constantijn Huygen (E-book ed.). Van Stockum.
- Krugten, Hermanus (1875). Het mirakuleus beeld van Onze Lieve Vrouw in 't Zand te Roermond en de waardige Joanna van Randenraedt (E-book ed.). Romen.
- Parker, Geoffrey (1990). The Dutch Revolt. Penguin Books Ltd. ISBN 0-14-013712-2.
