= First siege of Corbie =

- Part of the Thirty Years' War and the Franco-Spanish War (1635–59)
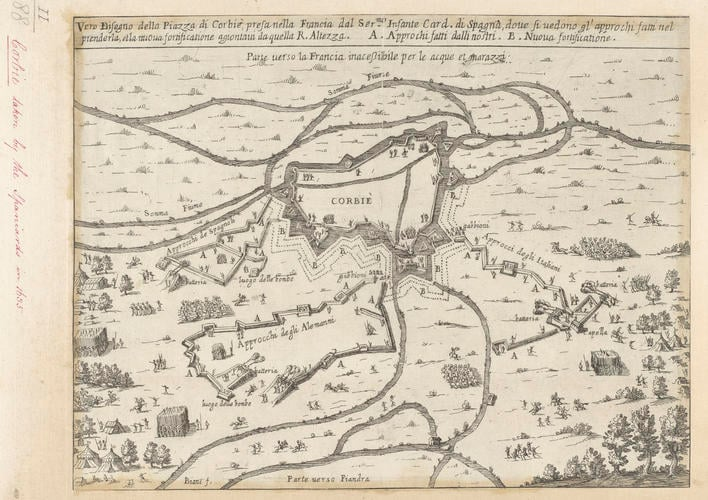
- Illustration showing the Spanish sieging Corbie
Date	7–15 August 1636
Location	Corbie, France
Result	Imperial-Spanish victory

Belligerents
France	Spain; Holy Roman Empire

Commanders and leaders
(Kingdom of France) Louis, Comté de Soissons	(Spain) Cardinal-Infante Ferdinand (Spain) Tommaso Francesco Prince of Carignano (Holy Roman Empire) Ottavio Piccolomini

Strength
14,000 (Note: This was only the French army under the Count of Soissons utilized during the campaign, the exact number of the garrison force stationed in the fortress is unknown)	18,000–25,000

Casualties and losses
Unknown	Unknown

The first siege of Corbie took place 7–15 August 1636 during the Thirty Years' War and the Franco-Spanish War (1635–59) where a Spanish army under the Cardinal-Infante Ferdinand and his lieutenant Prince of Carignano successfully capture the important French fortress of Corbie. The siege would only last a little over a week with the fortress eventually surrendering after eight days on 15 August. This important siege battle is part of the Crossing of the Somme campaign and caused a chain of events to happen after the siege with the French royal family fleeing Paris in fear of the Spanish tercios and the Cardinal-Infante's advance, which was thought to have been aimed towards the French capital.

== Background ==
The Cardinal-Infante would lead an army numbering 18,000–25,000 deep into France under the campaign planned by him and his subordinates months before. The Crossing of the Somme would be the main headstart for the campaign with the eventual goal of capturing vast territories within Île-de-France and ultimately, French Artois. The campaign overall would be quite a success with it being cut short because of the Dutch offensive back in the Spanish Netherlands and supply line issues in the French heartland. Corbie was open for an attack due to the aforementioned crossing of the Somme. The fortress of Corbie would be vital to continue any operations past the Somme, hence the Cardinal-Infante would begin the siege on 7 August. The fortress had artillery batteries all around with extra redoubts constructed by the French at the frontal batteries of the fort. These redoubts would also be equipped with cannons and served as forward batteries.

== Siege ==
With the siege starting on 7 August, the Cardinal-Infante would quickly begin constructing batteries around the fortress. The main goal of doing so would be to completely surround the fortress and use similar tactics such as those seen before at the siege of La Capelle and Le Catelet, with artillery firepower being the deciding factor. The siege would begin with artillery fire upon the fortress walls. The Spanish would have been using explosive shells by now, which to the French, was something they were not accustomed to as the invention wasn't prominent on their end. The Spanish artillery, throughout much of the Crossing of the Somme campaign was largely superior to the French with larger numbers, more supplies, and better firepower. This allowed the siege of Corbie to be just as efficient as those at La Capelle and Le Catelet. The Cardinal-Infante would issue orders to his lieutenant, the Prince of Carignano, to begin fully surrounding the fortress with the tercio regiments and companies, ready for a full-scale assault.

The French had constructed an extra layer of redoubts not long before the Spanish arrived, hence, they had favorable defensive positions. Yet, with the fortress fully surrounded and the French lacking adequate supplies, namely their artillery, their firepower was much lacking and the Spanish tercios made quick work of the French troops on the redoubts. The battle would not have had to last long either as the worsening situation of the French inclined them to surrender. Corbie would capitulate to the Spanish on 15 August with yet another success in the Crossing of the Somme campaign for the Cardinal-Infante. The siege would have paved the way for further success in the Cardinal-Infante's campaign in France had it not been for a renewed Dutch offensive in the Spanish Netherlands and several supply line issues.

== Aftermath ==
The siege is subject to many what-ifs by historians. The campaign could have gone further had circumstances been different for Cardinal-Infante Ferdinand. At the French court, it was believed that the Spanish army would advance further and target Paris. Ottavio Piccolomini was strongly in favor of pursuing the French until Paris but Ferdinand deemed the action to be too risky with low reward due to the weakening of the supply lines. Piccolomini himself was able to capture Roye and then Compiègne, which only added more to the French fright. The French royalty would flee from Paris with panic being raised amongst the population of Paris itself. The following day after the Spanish victory, Louis XIII would write to the Prince of Conde to abandon the siege of Dole and to withdraw his army and move towards Paris to help with its defense.

With Frederick Henry's campaign in the Spanish Netherlands during 1637, the Cardinal-Infante was forced to move back to Cambrai after seizing Corbie in order to face the Dutch threat, in which he ended up crushing the Dutch armies at Venlo and most importantly, at Kallo, which put a full end to any future Dutch attempts at a field battle, signifying a turning point in the Spanish Netherlands. Nonetheless, the inability to continue a campaign in France meant a future French takeover was inevitable if not enough attention was paid to the French front. The aforementioned then happened when the French army seized Corbie later that year with a large offensive utilizing the full French army. This was due to the fact that the French were expecting a large Spanish garrison stationed in Corbie along with the Cardinal-Infante's army, not knowing that he had already left the front to go deal with the Dutch, leaving only a few small garrisons to distract the French army and to keep them in place, diverted from the Spanish Netherlands.
