= Siege of Corbie =

Siege of Corbie may refer to either fo two sieges during 1636, "the year of Corbie" (French: l'année de Corbie):

- First siege of Corbie (7–15 August), capture of the place by the Spanish
- Second siege of Corbie (30 September – 14 November), recapture of the place by the French
