= Saint Germana =

Saint Germana may refer to

- Saint Germaine Cousin (1579–1601), French saint.
- Saint Grimonia, 4th-century Irish martyr
