= Tercio of Fuenclara =

Historical military unit of the Spanish armies

- Country: Spanish Empire
- Engagements: Thirty Years' War; Battle of Nördlingen (1634); Eighty Years' War; Siege of Venlo (1637); Battle of Kallo; Battle of Geldern

The Tercio of Fuenclara was a Spanish tercio organized in 1633 consisting of veteran native Spanish troops stationed in Italy that formed part of the Cardinal-Infante's army and then Spain's Army of Flanders based in the Spanish Netherlands.

== Background ==
Most tercios were named, or better known for their commanding officer (maestre de campo), such as the Tercio de Fuenclara for the Count of Fuenclara, although records sometimes blurred due to the fact that Spanish tercios were often integrated into others of the same ethnicity (such as the Spanish Tercio of Idiáquez), or reformed as command would often change hands. Other tercios were known by the location in which they were raised in, such as the native Spanish Tercio viejo de Lombardía.

== Actions ==
=== Thirty Years' War ===
The unit saw action at the Battle of Nördlingen with 1,450 troops, of which 200 musketeers of Fuenclara's tercio were ordered to be sent under their sargento mayor, Francisco de Escobar, by the Cardinal-Infante Ferdinand to hold the key position of the Heselberg hill and distinguished themselves in beating back several Swedish attacks whilst being outnumbered.

=== Eighty Years' War ===
The unit arrived in the Spanish Netherlands along with the rest of the army in 1635. Later in 1637 the unit also garrisoned Het Steen, the fortress at Antwerp.

At the Battle of Kallo (1638), the tercio was part of the main force commanded by the Cardinal-Infante which expelled the Dutch from their fortifications and eventually destroyed the routing army.

Due to the absence of the Count of Fuenclara, who was ill at Antwerp, the unit's then sargento mayor, Baltasar Mercader, took over the tercio temporarily in 1638 during the Cardinal-Infante's campaign and eventual battle at Geldern. It is unknown if the tercio continued serving afterwards, whether under a different commander or not.

== Officers and other ranks mentioned in the historiography ==
=== Maestres de campo ===
- Enrique de Alagón, Count of Fuenclara

=== Sargentos mayores ===
- Baltasar Mercader
- Francisco de Escobar
