= Siege of La Capelle =

Spanish siege of French fortress

- Part of the Franco-Spanish War
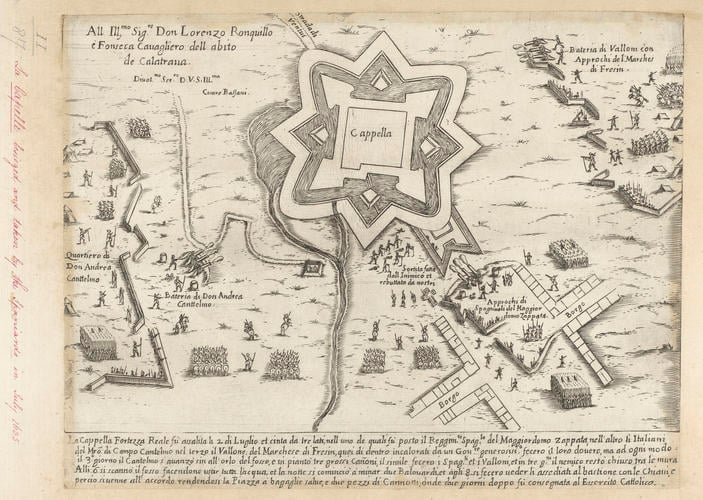
- Map of the Siege of La Capelle by Cesare Bassano
Date	2–8 July 1636
Location	La Capelle, France
Result	Spanish victory

Belligerents
France	Spain

Commanders and leaders
(Kingdom of France) Maréchal de Châtillon	(Spain) Cardinal-Infante Ferdinand

Strength
8,000	11,000

Casualties and losses
Unknown	Unknown

The siege of La Capelle took place from the 2nd to the 8th of July in 1636 during the Franco-Spanish War (1635–1659) in which a Spanish army under Cardinal-Infante Ferdinand managed to seize the fortress of La Capelle from the French army retreating from a previous defeat taking place at Leuven.

== Background ==
An army led by the Cardinal-Infante, Ferdinand, following a crushing victory against the French and the Dutch at Leuven, leads a counteroffensive into the Netherlands when an ensuing one in France after his successful campaign in the Netherlands. His army, relatively fresh and well-rested, outnumbered the French army and had better supply but would be tasked with capturing a multitude of targets in rapid succession. The main goal of the campaign was to threaten Paris, hence the capture of La Capelle was deemed vital. The French army had numbered around 8,000 after Leuven with the Spanish army, which was initially a relief army led by Ferdinand, numbering around 11,000. The French army, reasonably deteriorated with large supply problems faced during the campaign to meet up at Maastricht as well as dealing with low morale amongst the French troops, was forced to be on the defense against the Spanish threat. The ensuing 1636 campaign led by the Cardinal-Infante would face quite the success with one of the first targets within France to fall being La Capelle.

== Siege ==
The Spanish would set up the first artillery batteries south of the fortress in front of the main entrance redoubts. Several redoubts would be constructed surrounding the artillery batteries. The Spanish were quite quick to act and would also construct redoubts and two more batteries in the flanks to envelope the fortress. Cardinal-Infante Ferdinand would begin ordering artillery barrages upon the walls of the fortress, targeting the frontal artillery batteries of the French. With the much depleted French supplies and lack of artillery, the only attempt to repel the Spanish was made in a sortie at the main frontal battery of the fortress. The sortie would be unsuccessful and repelled with the Spanish continuing the artillery barrage with little to no French resistance in terms of artillery and firepower. The thousands of French soldiers were lacking in supply and therefore wouldn't have been able to last any longer.

With low French morale, paired with an unrelenting Spanish barrage, the French would have only been able to carry out one sortie as a final attack would be launched from the flanking redoubts by the Spanish tercio companies, and by the 8th of June, most French soldiers would have surrendered or fled. The fortress of La Capelle would be captured after just 6 days of siege. Ferdinand, with yet more success would only continue his campaign in France after securing the fortress completely and its perimeters. The town would also soon follow the defeat and surrender to the Spanish tercios.
