= Siege of Rheinberg =

Siege of Rheinberg may refer to:

- Siege of Rheinberg (1586–90), Spanish victory
- Siege of Rheinberg (1597), Dutch victory
- Siege of Rheinberg (1598), Spanish victory
- Siege of Rheinberg (1601), Dutch victory
- Siege of Rheinberg (1606), Spanish victory
- Siege of Rheinberg (1633), Dutch victory
