= Crossing of the Somme =

1636 battle of the Thirty Years' War

- Part of the Thirty Years' War and the Franco-Spanish War (1635–59)
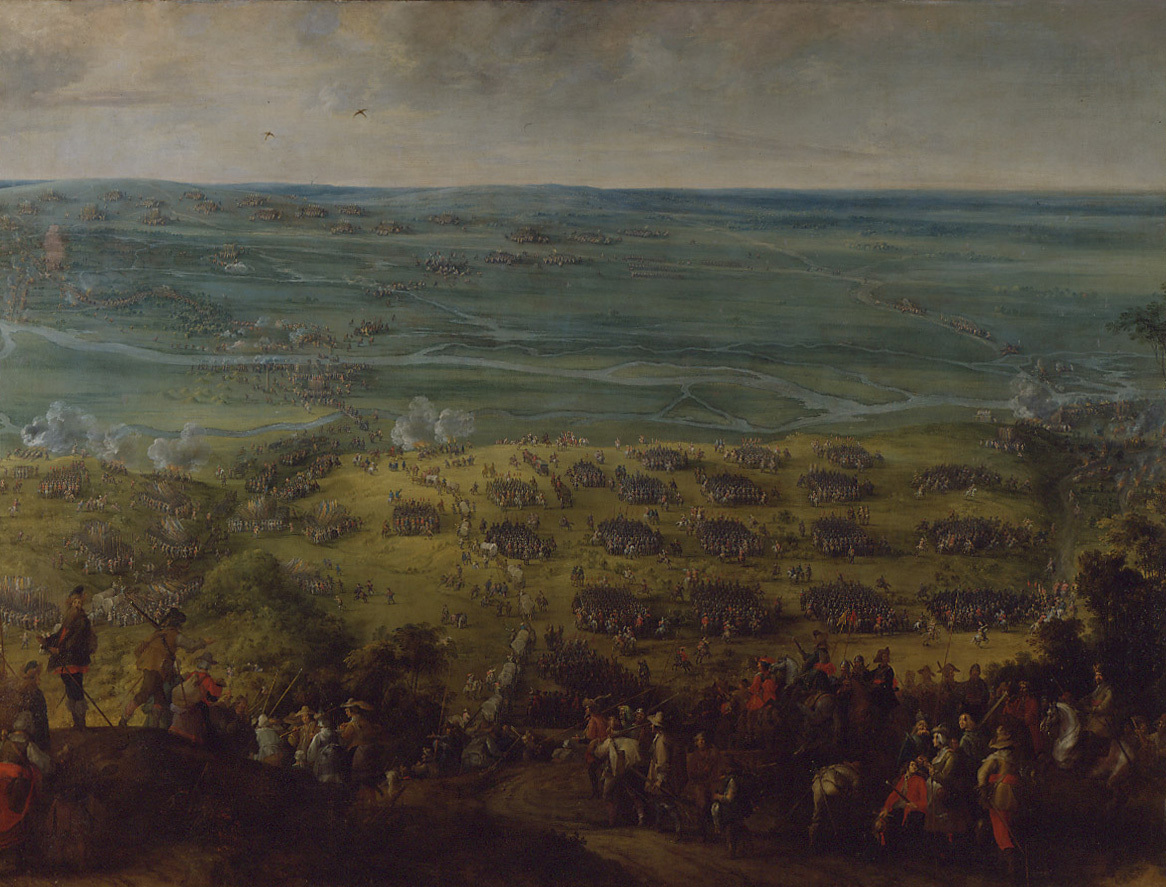
- Crossing of the Somme, 1636. Oil on canvas by Peter Snayers.
Date	5 August 1636
Location	Bray-sur-Somme, Picardy, France
Result	Imperial-Spanish victory

Belligerents
France	Spain; Holy Roman Empire

Commanders and leaders
(Kingdom of France) Louis de Soissons	(Spain) Cardinal-Infante Ferdinand (Spain) Prince of Carignano (Spanish Empire) Alonso de Fuensaldaña (Holy Roman Empire) Ottavio Piccolomini

Strength
14,000	18,000–25,000

Casualties and losses
700–800 soldiers killed 13 captains 14 lieutenants 16 corporals	35 killed and 50 wounded (reported)

The Crossing of the Somme took place on 5 August 1636 during the Thirty Years' War and the Franco-Spanish War when units of the Spanish Army of Flanders and the Imperial Army under Thomas Francis, Prince of Carignano, lieutenant of the Cardinal-Infante Ferdinand of Austria, crossed the Somme river near Bray-sur-Somme during its offensive in French territory. Despite the fierce resistance of the French army led by Louis de Bourbon, Count of Soissons, the allied troops successfully crossed the river and drove off the French troops along the Oise river, proceeding over the following weeks to invest the important fortress of Corbie, located two leagues upriver of Amiens, which caused a spread of panic among the population of Paris.

== Background ==
Shortly after France declared the war on Spain in May 1635, a French army under the Marshals of France Urbain de Maillé-Brézé and Gaspard III de Coligny, allied with the Dutch States Army, invaded the Spanish Netherlands from two sides and threatened Brussels before investing Leuven. The siege ended in a costly failure because of bad logistics and organization, and as the French army was decimated by the plague. The Cardinal-Infante Ferdinand, governor of the Spanish Netherlands, counterattacked and expelled the invaders, concentrating his resources against the Dutch over the following months. The recapture by the statholder Frederick Henry of Orange of the key fortress of Schenkenschans did not discouraged the Spanish, and the Count-Duke of Olivares continued determined to concentrate the war effort against the Dutch.

After suffering further defeats against the armies of the Duke Charles of Lorraine and the Imperial generalissimo Matthias Gallas in the Rhine, Alsace and Lorraine, the French armies remained focused in the defense and reconquest of strategic places in these territories. The conquest of the Franche-Comté, entrusted to Henri de Bourbon, Prince de Condé and Charles de La Porte de La Meilleraye, soon became an absolute priority to the Cardinal Richelieu. The Holy Roman Emperor, Ferdinand II, whose position in Germany had strengthened since the Peace of Prague, meanwhile, projected an invasion of the eastern France under Matthias Gallas, but as logistical and financial problems diminished his force, he proposed a joint invasion to the Cardinal-Infante. Philip IV of Spain and Olivares rapidly agreed.

A lightly equipped army ranging from 10,000–12,000 infantry and 13,000 cavalry soldiers to 18,000 soldiers of both types, including an imperialist contingent under Ottavio Piccolomini was gathered at Mons during June. On 2 July the Cardinal-Infante crossed the frontier via Avesnes and took the fortresses of Le Catelet and La Capelle. Though having large garrisons, La Capelle surrendered after only six days of siege and Le Catelet, one of the strongest fortresses of France, after three days thanks to the exploding shells used by the Spanish army, a recent innovation yet unfamiliar to the French. The alarming advance of the Cardinal-Infante forced Louis XIII to return to Paris from Fontainebleau. By then Ferdinand was in Cambrai and had left the command of his army to the Prince Thomas Francis of Carignano, the commander of the Army of Flanders.

== Battle ==
The Prince of Carignano took over the army and headed to Saint Quentin with the aim of continuing the invasion and attracting Louis de Bourbon, Count of Soissons, who was in Picardy in command of a force of 14,000 soldiers, and his army to the town. Having arrived at the fields in front of Saint Quentin, the Prince changed the route of the army and advanced towards the Somme river. The Cardinal Infante sent to him don Esteban de Gamarra, a gentleman in his confidence, to transmit the order to cross the Somme at the village Bray-sur-Somme or at an easier place even if the French armies were guarding the riverside. Pontoons and boats were dispatched from Cambrai for this purpose.

The Prince put on alert his Maestres de Campo and Colonels and set route to Bray. On 4 August his troops occupied a small island in middle of the river and soon a skirmish began with the French troops on the other riverside. The Count of Soissons, who were stationed with his troops on a nearby hill, believed that the Spanish were attempting to cross the river in that place and detached its battalions and squadrons near the riverside to reject every attempt. The Marquis of Fontenay, who led these troops, set fire to the village and entrenched his soldiers in a series of forts built in the riverside. The skirmish continued a long time with artillery and musketry fire. According to the French, only 20 of his soldiers were killed, among them the Comte de Matha, captain of a company of the Régiment des Gardes.

The Prince ordered his Tercios of Spaniards march to the village of Cerisy, located a league south of Bray, and cross there the river. A pontoon bridge was promptly tended from one bank to the opposite, and large amounts of faggots previously prepared were spread on the marshy land to facilitate the crossing of the soldiers. Only the Régiment de Piedmont was in that place to confront the Spaniards. These formed in squadron at the riverside and became involved in a stubborn fight that lasted for three hours. The Régiment de Piedmont, reinforced by a company of the Régiment des Gardes, tried to expel them from the pontoons and the road of faggots with great fierceness, but thanks to the presence of the Prince, who took the command of the attack, the Spaniards managed to cross the river and drove off the Régiment de Piemont from the riverside.

The Maestro de Campo Alonso Pérez de Vivero y Menchaca, Count of Fuensaldaña, put then his soldiers to work in the digging of trenches to cover them from a possible counterattack. The Spanish artillery and some musketeers riddled the forest where the Régiment de Piedmont had sought coverage and forced the few surviving troops to retreat leaving behind about 700-800 corpses. The Prince lost that day around 35 soldiers killed and 50 wounded. The French losses could have been higher if the Spanish cavalry had crossed the river in time to pursue them, but this did not happen and Soissons was able to withdraw his troops in good order.

== Aftermath ==
The Prince of Carignano, searching the destruction of the retreating French army, dispatched Ottavio Piccolomini in command of his cavalry and Johann von Werth with the Spanish cavalry behind the Count of Soissons, who was forced to pass the Oise river. The harassment of the German and Spanish cavalry diminished the strength of the French army, finding the Imperial-Spanish troops abandoned corpses and weapons at his advance. Piccolomini's persecution of the retreating French army lead him to Roye, which he captured and from where he reached Compiègne and advanced further into French territory, which caused consternation in Paris. Meanwhile, Soissons retreated to Noyon pursued by Johann von Werth. The Bavarian general destroyed 5 French cavalry regiments near the town, but he had not enough forces to attempt its capture.

On 7 August the Prince of Carignano, by orders of the Cardinal-Infante, surrounded the vital fortress of Corbie, which surrendered to him a week later. The following day Louis XIII wrote to the Prince of Condé ordering him to abandon the siege of Dôle and to withdraw from the Franche-Comté to help defend Paris. At the French court it was believed that after Corbie the Spanish would advance further into France. Piccolomini, who wanted to do so, tried to persuade the Cardinal-Infante. The Cardinal-Infante felt that more ambitious operations could risk his army and resolved to retreat. He was back in Cambrai in early September, before Matthias Gallas' invasion of France had begun, and the French armies regained most of the lost ground over the following months.
