= Gil de Albornoz y Espinosa =

Spanish Catholic cardinal (1581-1649)

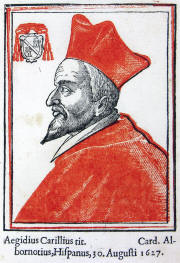
The text reads: Aegidius Carillius tit. Card. Albornotius, Hispanus, 30. Augusti 1627. "Gil Carrillo, titled Cardinal Albornoz, a Spaniard, [raised a cardinal] on 30 August 1627."

Gil de Albornoz y Espinosa (1581 – 19 December 1649), called Egidio Carillo Albornozio in Italian sources, was a Spanish Catholic Cardinal who led the Spanish delegation at the papal conclave of 1644.

== Biography ==
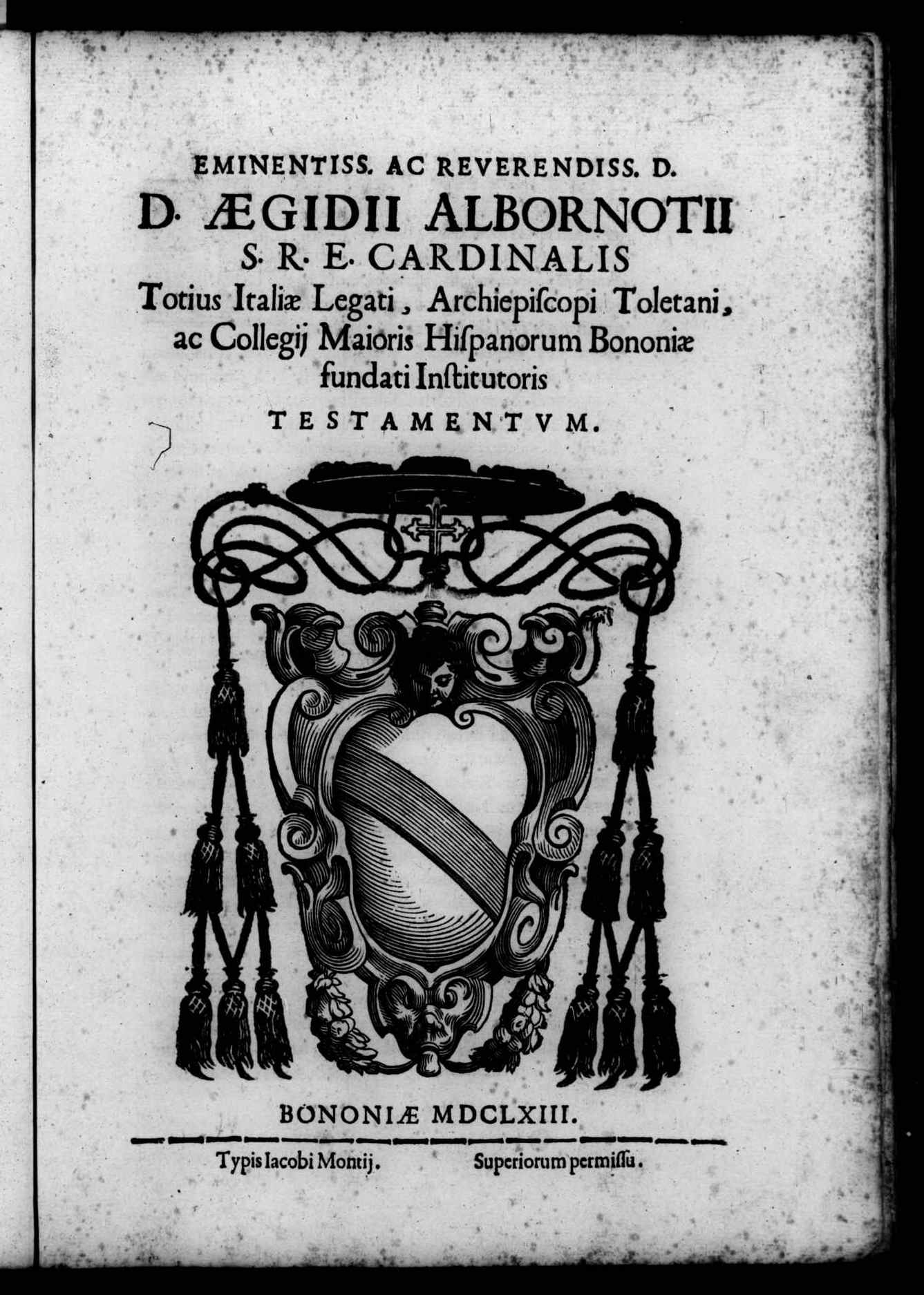
Testament of the cardinal (Testamentum cardinalis Egidi Albornotii), 1663

Albornoz was born in 1579 in Talavera de la Reina, Spain, the son of Francisco de Albornoz (a Knight of the Military Order of Calatrava) and Felipa de Espinosa (niece of the powerful Cardinal Diego de Espinosa). He was educated as a civil lawyer at the Oviedo and Salamanca universities.

He was appointed Archbishop of Taranto in 1630. He was elevated to Cardinal in August 1630 and became a valued religious advisor to King Philip IV of Spain. He helped to maintain pressure on francophile Pope Urban VIII and led negotiations with the Pope relating to the Wars of Castro. He was the appointed representative of Spain in the Sacred College of Cardinals from 1632.

He was appointed Governor of the Duchy of Milan between July 1634 and November 1635.

== Papal conclave of 1644 ==
Albornoz participated in the Papal Conclave of 1644 which elected Pope Innocent X, presenting the Spanish veto against the election of Cardinal Giulio Cesare Sacchetti, promoted by Antonio Barberini and France´s PM, Cardinal Jules Mazarin. Although he was urged to return to Spain, he continued residing in Rome until his death on 19 December 1649. He was buried in the church of S. Anna nel Quirinale, Rome.

== Sources ==
- Anselmi, Alessandra (2014). I rapporti tra Roma e Madrid nei secoli XVI e XVII: arte diplomazia e politica (in Italian). Gangemi Editore.

Political offices
Preceded by Cardinal-Infante Ferdinand of Austria	Governor of the Duchy of Milan; 1634–1635	Succeeded by Diego Felipez de Guzmán, 1st Marquis of Leganés
