= Siege of Rheinberg (1633) =

Siege during the Eighty Years' War

- Part of Eighty Years' War
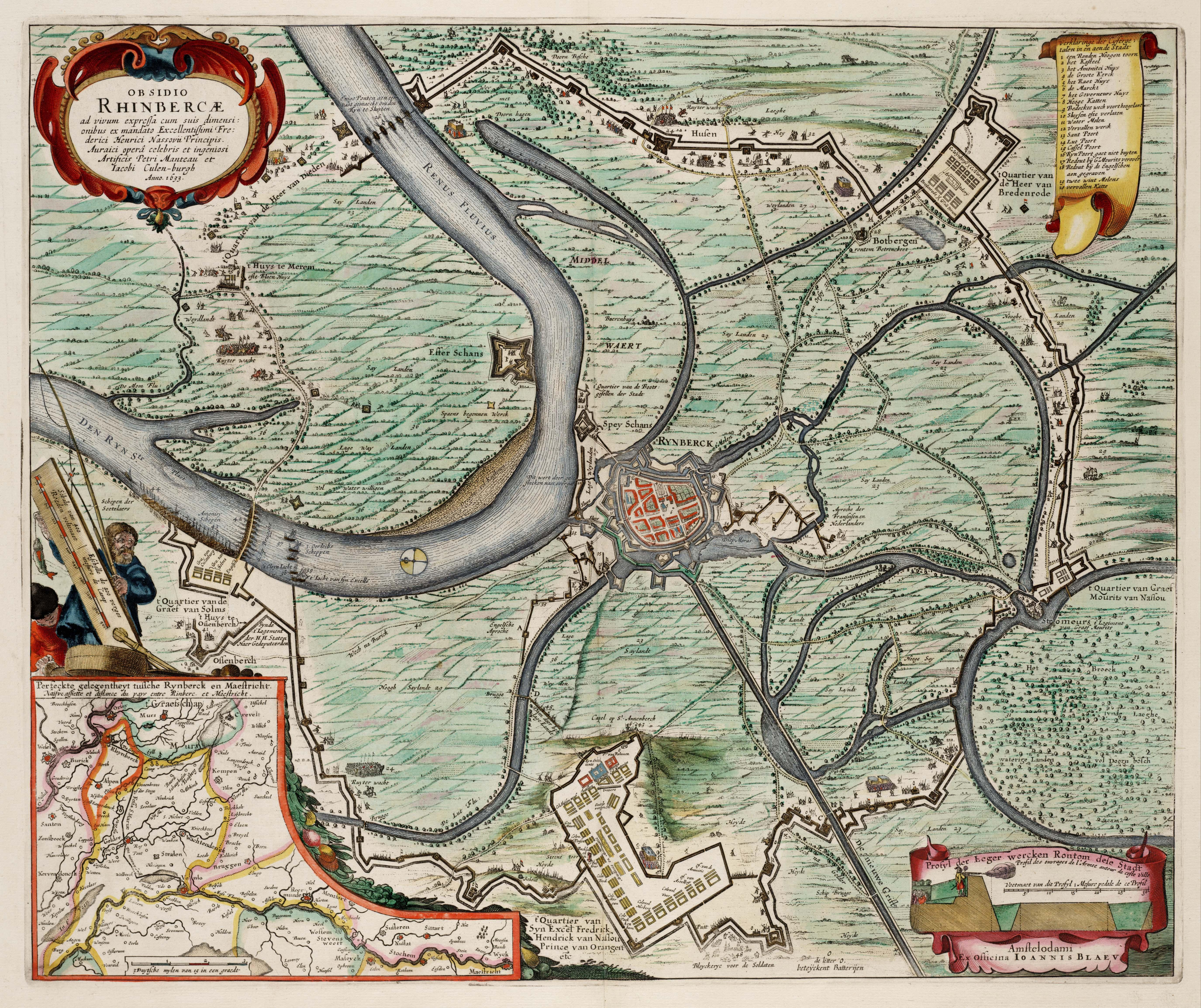
- Depiction of the siege of Rheinberg by Manteau Culenburgh
Date	11 June – 2 July 1633
Location	Rheinberg, Germany
Result	Dutch victory

Belligerents
Dutch Republic	(Habsburg Spain) Spain

Commanders and leaders
(Dutch Republic) Frederick Henry	(Habsburg Spain) Marquis of Aitona

Strength
20,000	1,700

The siege of Rheinberg was a 21-day siege led by Frederick Henry, the then Prince of Orange. The siege resulted in a Dutch victory, with the last major Spanish-controlled city near the Rhine falling into Dutch hands.

== Background ==
Rheinberg was captured by the Spanish in 1606 after a siege between Spanish forces led by Ambrogio Spinola against the opposing Dutch forces led by Maurice of Nassau. After 1606, Rheinberg was the only town left under Spanish rule near the Rhine, and after Frederick Henry's Meuse campaign, the Spanish territory among the Meuse saw a significant decrease.

Frederick Henry marched toward Rheinberg with his army, while Aytona advanced with his smaller force of 14,000 men from Brabant in an attempt to prevent the siege. However, Aytona was not in a position to cross the Rhine. Aytona, however, did manage to conquer the cities of Maaseik, Weert, and Stevensweert. This isolated the Dutch garrison stationed in Maastricht, and solidified the Spanish grip on Jülich and Geldern.

== Siege ==
Frederick Henry arrived at Rheinberg with a large army on 11 June. The city was poorly protected and had a weak garrison and city walls looked like they could have been climbed. The city was attacked from 3 different sides, the parts that were attacked were the hornworks on the Haagsche- and Ginnekenpoort, next to the castle. The attacks were defended from 2 forts, the Efferschans and Speyerschans. On the tenth day after opening the trenches, the attackers reached the covered road, and from the covered road they were able to capture the Ginnekenport after which they could entrench themselves. The attackers created a battery, in which they were able to undermine the bastion via a Gallery. The same method was used on the other sides of the attack, and at that moment breaches were created by laying mines. And were able to storm the city afterwards. Two major and the final attacks of the siege were carried out, after which the city surrendered.

== Aftermath ==
On 2 July, the garrison stationed in Rheinberg surrendered. Two days later the garrison had to leave their wives and priests, and the 'Contribution' in Twente and the County of Zutphen came to an end as result. And because the city was captured, the project called 'Fossa Eugenia' came to an end. The Fossa Eugenia was a canal project which was initiated in 1626, the purpose of the canal was to connect the Meuse and Rhine, and the secondary purpose was to cut off trade with the Northern Provinces, so the capture of Rheinberg and Venlo meant an end to this project.

== Sources ==
- Israel, Jonathan (1997). Conflicts of Empires, Spain, the Low Countries and the Struggle for World Supremacy, 1585- (E-book ed.). Bloomsbury Publishing. p. 42. ISBN 978-0-8264-3553-8.
- Bosscha, Joannes (1870). Neerlands heldendaden te land, van de vroegste tijden af tot op onze dagen, Volumes 1-2 (E-book ed.). G.T.N. Suringar. p. 376.
- Ubachs, Pierre (2000). Handboek voor de geschiedenis van Limburg (E-book ed.).
