= Capture of Roermond =

1637 siege and capture of Roermond by Spain

- Part of the Eighty Years' War
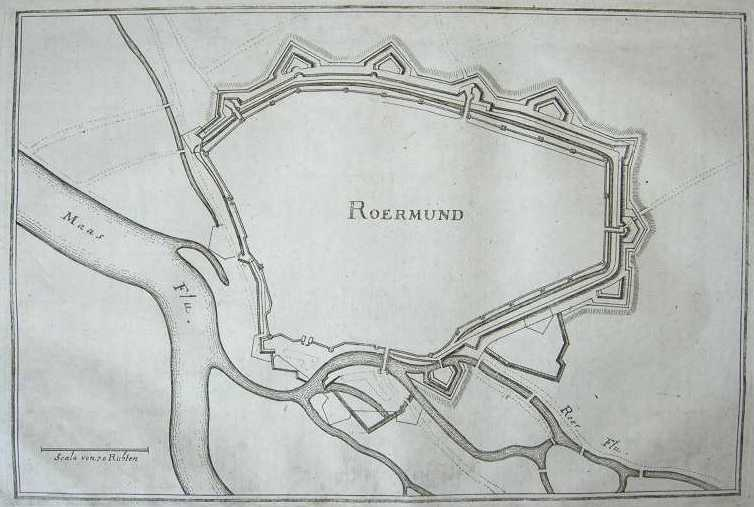
Date	31 August – 1 September 1637
Location	Roermond (present-day the Netherlands)
Result	Spanish victory

Belligerents
Spain	Dutch Republic

Commanders and leaders
(Spain) Cardinal-Infante Ferdinand	(Dutch Republic) Carpentier

Strength
17,000 soldiers	1,100 infantry 2 cavalry companies

Casualties and losses
Minor	Minor; Many weapons and baggage lost

The Capture of Roermond was a minor siege during the Eighty Years' War which took place from 31 August to 1 September 1637. A Spanish army under Cardinal-Infante Ferdinand would successfully siege and seize Roermond from the Dutch just one week after his victory at Venlo. This siege battle and that of Venlo were originally targeted to draw Frederick Henry away from Berda and towards the Cardinal-Infante's army for what could have been a field battle. Frederick Henry would not be swayed by this attempt and was dedicated to sieging Breda and would eventually take it on 11 October.

== Siege ==
The campaign led by the Cardinal-Infante would be rather successful with large swathes of territory being captured near and around Maastricht. Venlo fell just a week before the Spanish army laid eyes on Roermond, which served to cut off Maastricht from the Dutch and prevent any further Dutch attacks from the east. The next step would be to take Roermond in which, knowing so, Ferdinand sent his cavalry to rapidly invest in the siege of the city. The siege wouldn't be long as the Spanish would heavily bombard their opponents into submission. This might be attributed to specialized Spanish explosive shells which were being utilized against the French and the Dutch. The city would surrender on 1 September, which secured a total separation of Maastricht from the Dutch Republic.
