= Siege of Leuven =

1635 battle of the Thirty Years' War

- Part of the Eighty Years' War, the Thirty Years' War and the Franco-Spanish War (1635-1659)
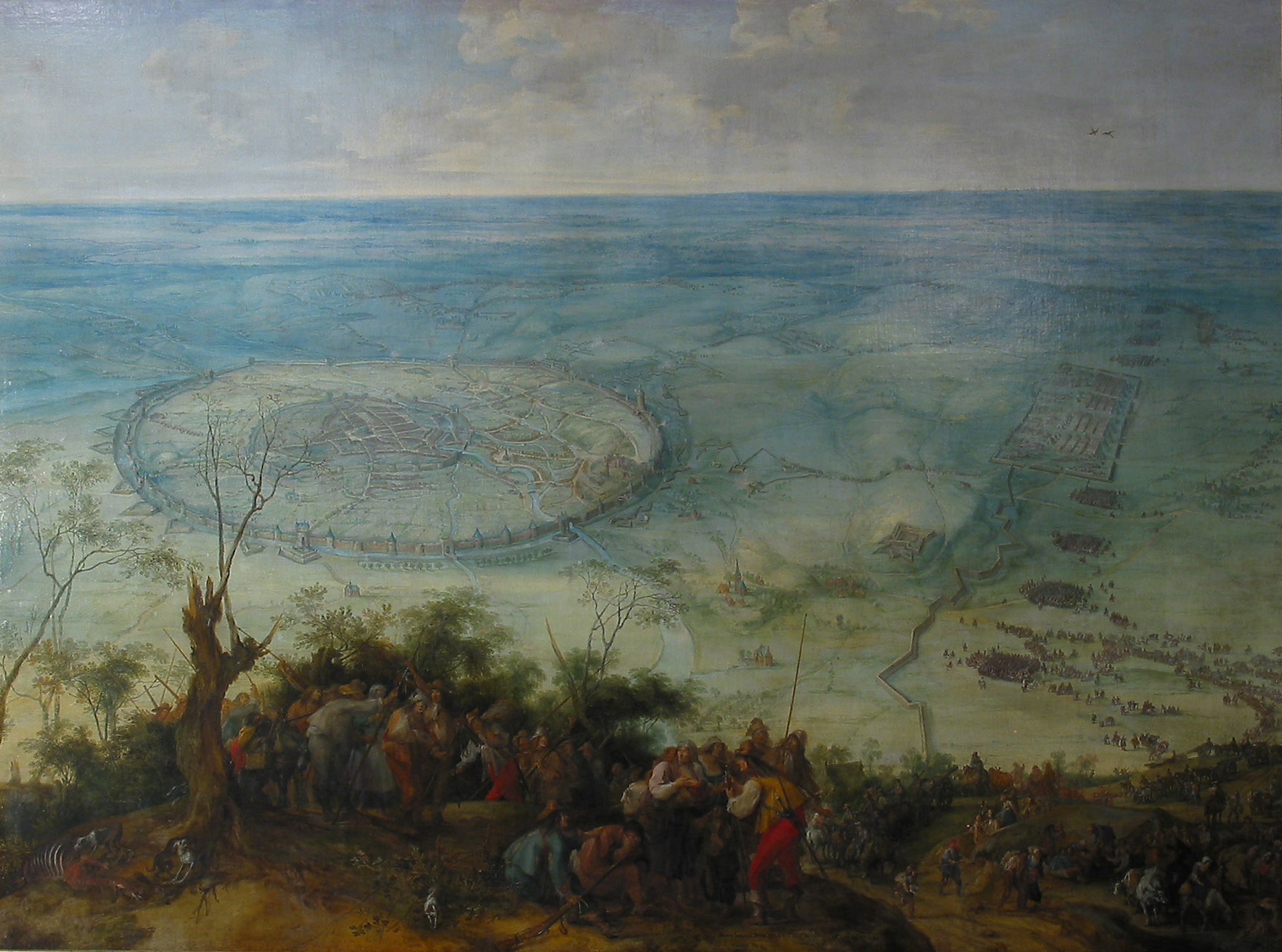
- Relief of Louvain. Oil on canvas by Peter Snayers.
Date	24 June – 4 July 1635
Location	Leuven, Spanish Netherlands (present-day Belgium) 50°53′N 4°42′E
Result	Imperial-Spanish victory
Territorial changes	Franco-Dutch invasion of the Spanish Netherlands defeated

Belligerents
Spain; Holy Roman Empire	Dutch Republic; Kingdom of France

Commanders and leaders
(Spanish Empire) Cardinal-Infante Ferdinand (Spanish Empire) Anthonie Schetz (Holy Roman Empire) Ottavio Piccolomini	(Dutch Republic) Frederick Henry (Kingdom of France) Marquis de Brézé (Kingdom of France) Maréchal de Châtillon

Strength
Garrison: 4,000; Relief force: 11,000	56,000 (Note: 30,000 from the Netherlands and 26,000 from France. Although the Franco-Dutch alliance agreed to each bring 30,000 for the joint invasion, the French army was 4,000 men short.)

Casualties and losses
700	At least 18,000 (Note: According to Wilson, the French army was reduced to 8,000 men. Dutch casualties are unknown.)
- Location within Belgium

The siege of Leuven (24 June – 4 July 1635) was an important siege in the Thirty Years' War in which a Franco-Dutch army under Frederick Henry of Orange and the French Marshals Urbain de Maillé-Brezé and Gaspard III de Coligny, who had invaded the Spanish Netherlands from two sides, laid siege to the city of Leuven, defended by a force of 4,000 comprising local citizen and student militias with Walloons, Germans, Spanish and Irish of the Army of Flanders under Anthonie Schetz, Baron of Grobbendonck. Poor organization and logistics and the spread of sickness among the French, along with the appearance of an Imperial-Spanish relief army of 11,000 under Cardinal-Infante Ferdinand and Ottavio Piccolomini, forced the invading army to lift the siege. This failure allowed the Spanish forces to take the initiative and soon the invaders were forced into a headlong retreat.

== Background ==
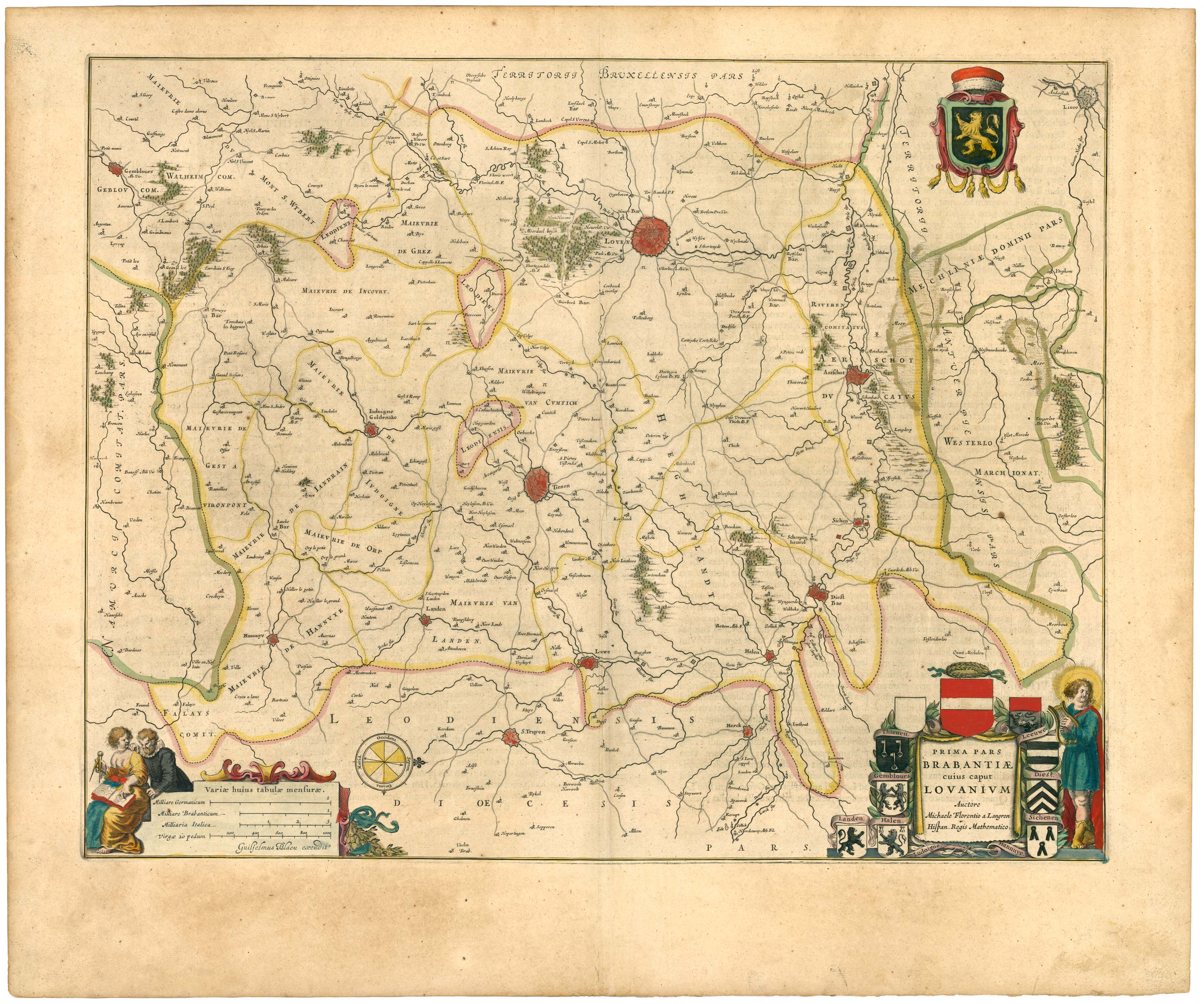
Map of Brabant in 1645 by Joan Blaeu

In 1635 the Dutch Republic concluded an alliance with France with the objective of taking on the Army of Flanders from two sides, in the hope of breaking the strategic stalemate in the Eighty Years' War and dividing up the Spanish Netherlands between the two partners in the alliance. The French invaded from the south and defeated the Spanish army at Les Avins on 20 May, eventually joining forces in Maastricht with Frederick Henry of Orange, who had departed the Dutch Republic in command of 20,000 infantry and 6,000 cavalry soldiers,. Meanwhile, the Cardinal-Infante Ferdinand, who was in Leuven, ordered the Spanish Tercios to move to Tienen and sent the Count of Fuenclara to Germany with instructions to call the Imperial army for help.

The joint army of France and the United Provinces, then numbering 50,000 men, composed by French, Dutch, German and English soldiers, marched to Tienen, defended by a small garrison under Captain Martín de los Alarcos. The town was taken by assault, looted for three days, and finally razed. The Spanish garrison and most of its inhabitants were massacred. This event gave Ferdinand time to improve the fortifications of Leuven and to camp his army in a fortified position next to the city. The Franco-Dutch army made its appearance soon after and camped two leagues from Ferdinand's headquarters. Nevertheless, they remained inactive for eight days, which allowed the populace of all the country, but specially of Brussels, where the news of the sack of Tienen had caused great fear, to escape to safer places.

== Siege ==
=== First operations ===
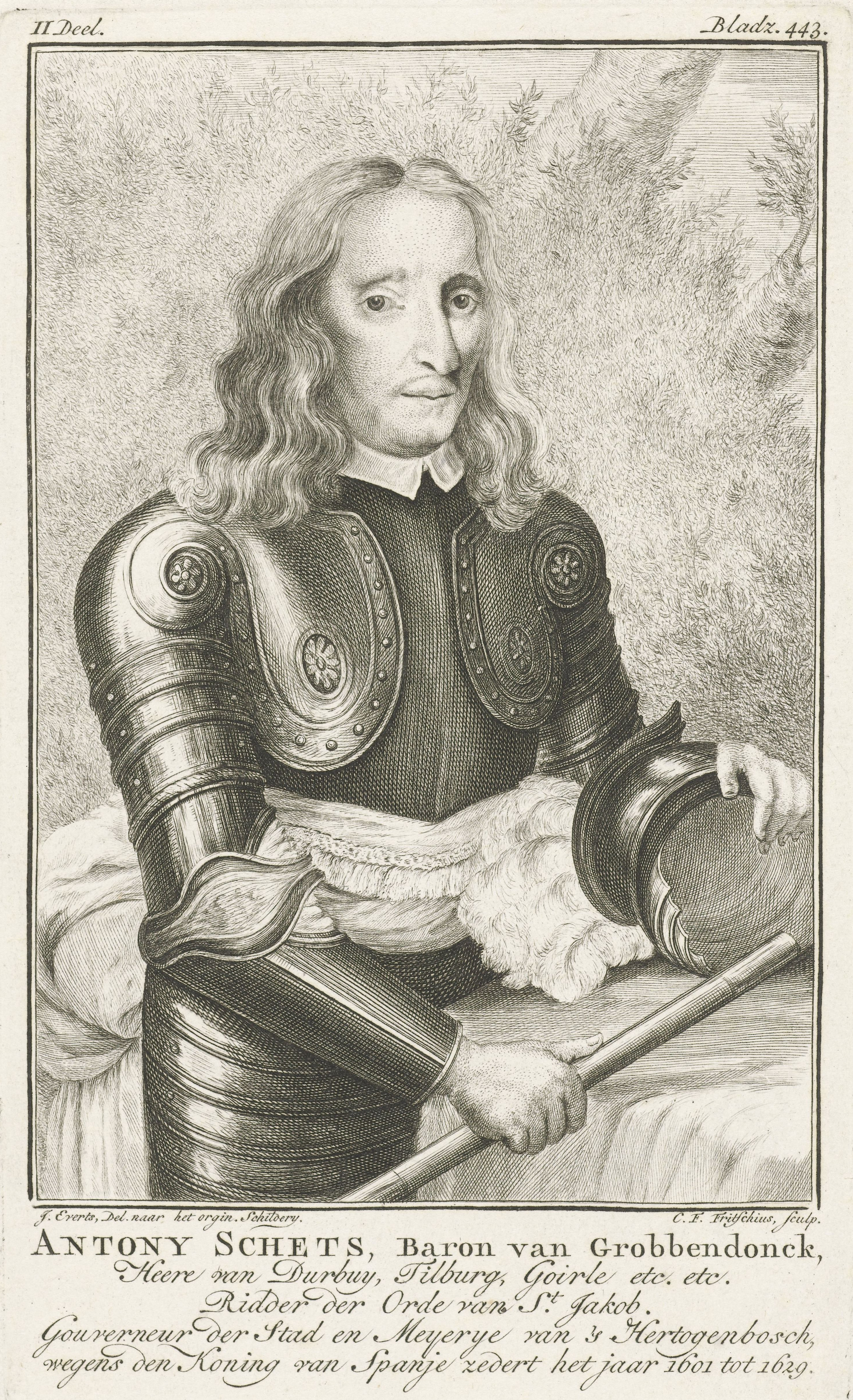
Anthonie Schetz, Baron of Grobbendonck.

On 20 June the Franco-Dutch army raised camp and advanced its lines to the eastern bank of the Dijle river. Francisco de Moncada, 3rd Marquis of Aitona, commanding the Spanish Tercio of Marquis of Celada, several other tercios, and the cavalry under John VIII of Nassau-Siegen, proceeded to reinforce the German garrison of a fortified bridge over the Dijle fearing that the invading army would use it to cross the river. The Spanish troops spent two hours observing the Franco-Dutch forces moving over the hills of the opposite riverside, when they discovered that they were crossing the Dijle using an undefended footbridge located a league from the first one. The Duke of Lerma was immediately sent to prevent the crossing, in command of some cavalry under Juan de Vivero and 300 musketeers of Celada's tercio led by Captain Antonio de Velandia. By the time they arrived, more than 4,000 Franco-Dutch had passed the bridge and occupied strong defensive positions, as they had begun the maneuver at dawn of the same day. Seeing this, the Duke of Lerma ordered Celada to withdraw, warning him through Captain Diego de Luna that he could not relieve him if his men were attacked, as the cavalry under Johann von Nassau-Siegen had fallen behind.

=== Siege ===
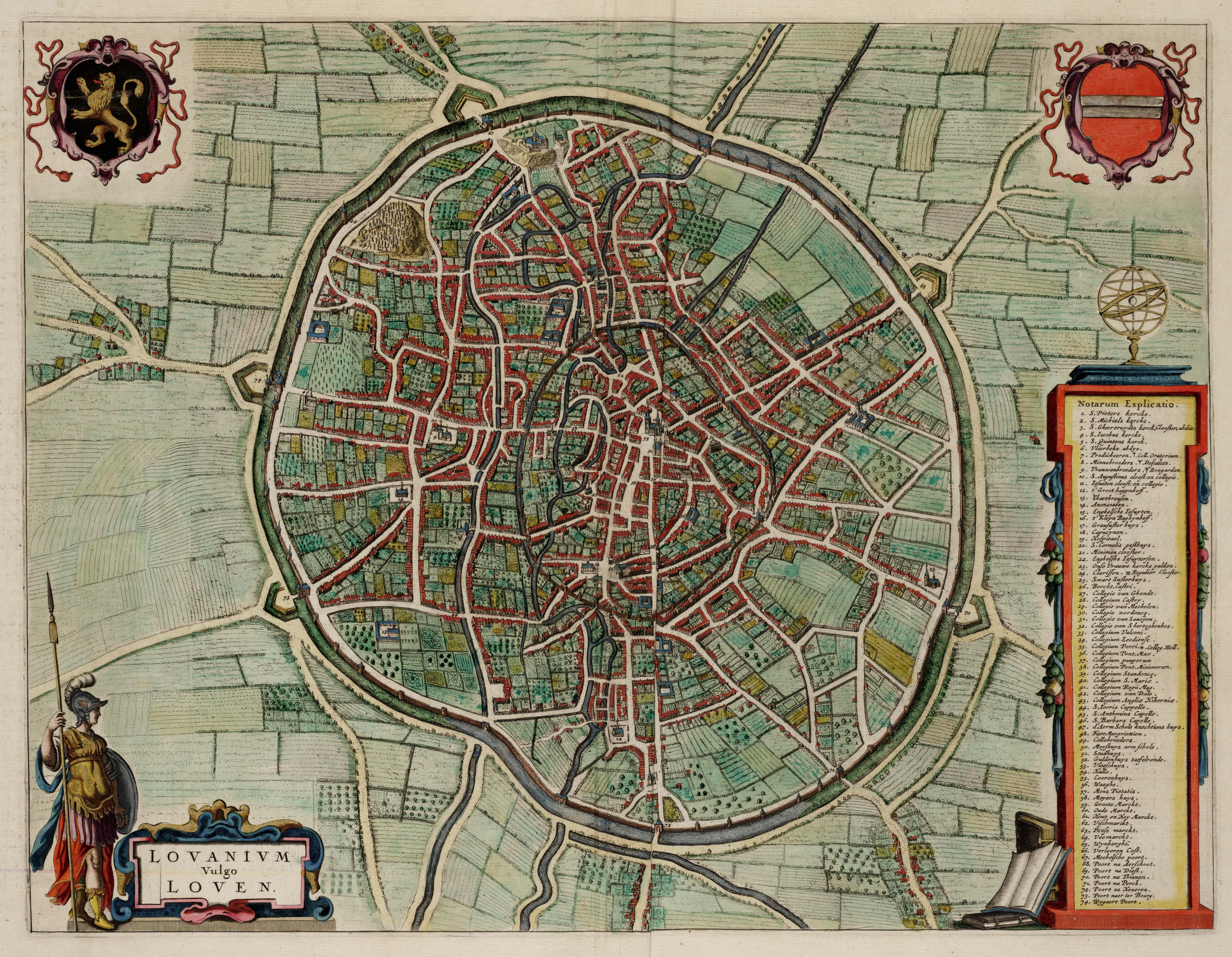
Map of Leuven in 1649 by Joan Blaeu

That night all the artillery and baggage marched back to Brussels, and the following day so did the Cardinal-Infante with his camp, leaving the defense of Leuven in charge of the veteran Anthonie Schetz, baron of Grobbendonck. He was in command of the Tercio of his son, Baron of Wezemaal, the Walloon Tercio of Ribacourt, and the Irish Tercio of Thomas Preston, besides five militia companies of citizens of Leuven and students of the University of Leuven, and some cavalry units. The Franco-Dutch army, having crossed the Dijle, looted the village of Tervuren, residence of the Dukes of Brabant, and reached the outskirts of Brussels. They soon turned back to Leuven to invest the town. Siege warfare ensued, with the allied artillery firing over Leuven's fortifications and the pioneers driving trenches and mines toward the ramparts. Most of the works were carried out at the gate of Vilvoorde, defended by Preston with his Irish tercio, whose numerous sorties to obstruct the siege works easily demoralized the poorly supplied French soldiers. Walloon troops and students of the university also made many sorties, and the sap works were destroyed regularly every night.

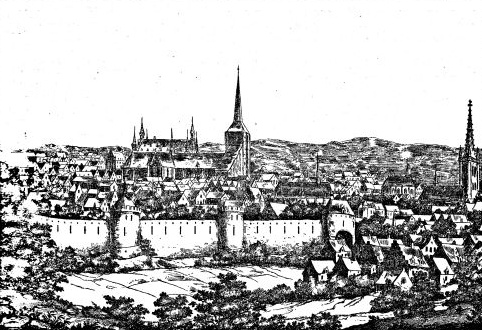
Leuven in 1610, by Josse van der Baren. The town still had medieval walls in 1635.

The besiegers, irritated by the obstruction to their works, decided to storm the ramparts even exposed to enemy fire, taking advantage of their numerical superiority. On one night three regiments assaulted the ramparts and bulwarks from the most advanced entrenchments, but were bloodily repelled by the wakeful defenders. The following night, Frederick Henry in person led an assault on the ravelin which protected the gate of Mechelen, guarded by just a handful of Irish. Despite the initial success of the attack, the Irish, aided by some Germans and bourgeois, managed to reject Frederick Henry inflicting him serious losses. Much of the failure was caused by the fact that the maneuvers of his army were being observed from a well-fortified tower, situated between the gates of Mechelen and Vilvoorde, popularly called Verlooren-Kost. This tower, besides as artillery position, served as look-out to Baron of Grobbendonck. When the Franco-Dutch realized this, the Verlooren-Kost was put under heavy artillery fire, but the 9-meter-thick walls of the tower could not be overthrown.

=== Relief ===
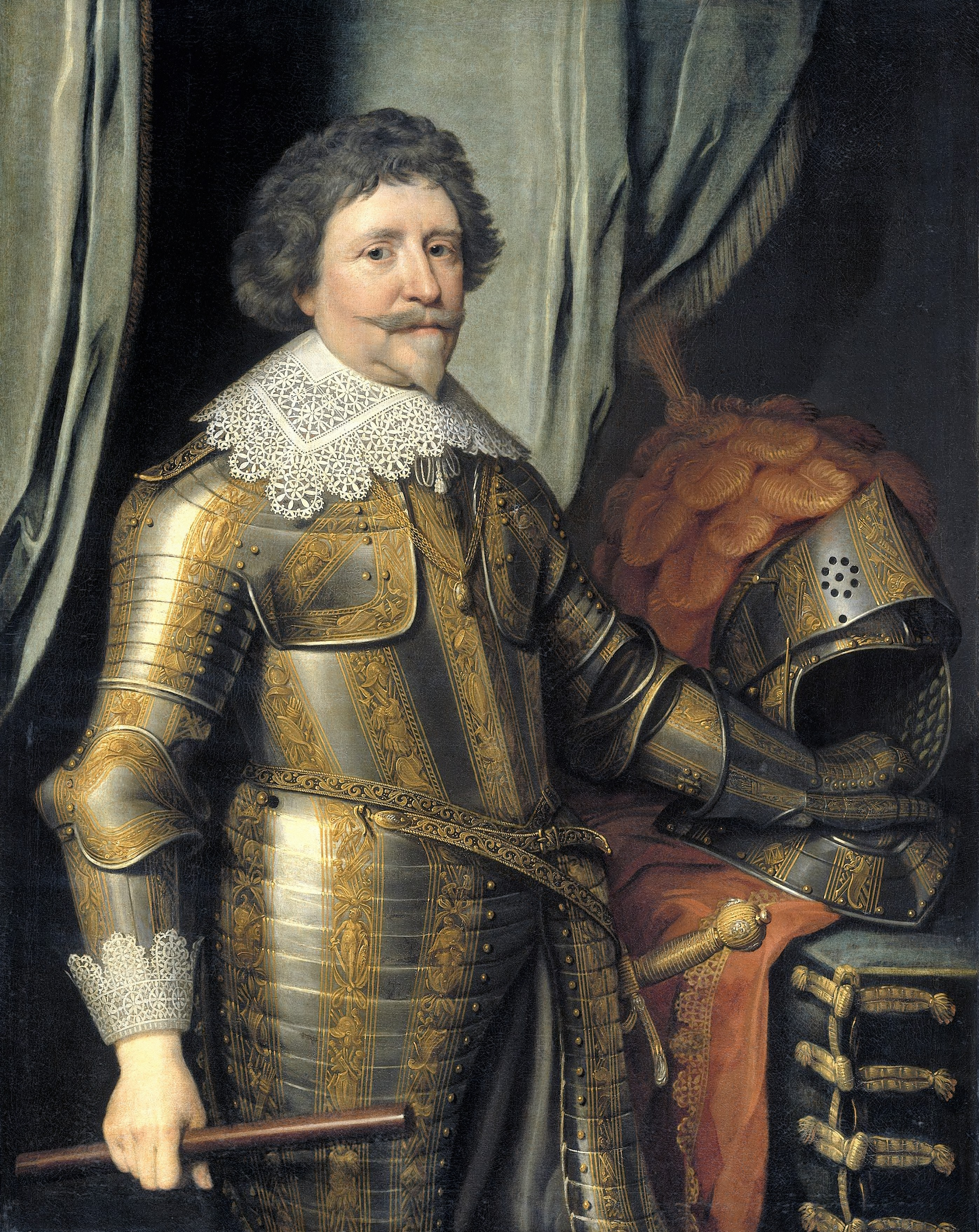
Prince Frederick Henry by Michiel Jansz van Mierevelt

On 29 June, Feast of Saints Peter and Paul, while the Franco-Dutch remained inactive, Grobbendonck ordered 250 selected defenders to make a sortie. They went out from three different gates and met in front of the Verlooren-Kost tower. Then they stormed the besieging entrenchments by surprise, taking the troops occupying them completely unprepared. About 400 men, including a large number of officers, were killed. Despite the setback he suffered, Frederick Henry urged Grobbendonck that same day to surrender, threatening to massacre the inhabitants of the town. Five days later a relief army under Ottavio Piccolomini of 8,000 cavalry troops and the tercios of Alonso Ladrón and Sigismondo Sfondrati, which had been garrisoned at Namur to recover the defeat of Les Avins, and a rearguard of 3,000 infantry and cavalry troops arrived in the outskirts of Leuven. Their presence forced the Franco-Dutch army, which was then suffering food shortages, to lift the siege and retreat north towards the United Provinces. A large number of soldiers deserted and were killed or captured by the Spanish cavalry and the Flemish peasants. Shortly afterwards the Cardinal-Infante also made his appearance in command of 22,000 infantry and 14,000 cavalry men.

== Aftermath ==
The Franco-Dutch failure in front of Leuven's walls allowed the Spanish to take the initiative. The Cardinal-Infante counter-attacked, pushing the Franco-Dutch army back to the Dutch border. He made a north-easterly thrust to the Rhine in the direction of Cleves, recapturing Diest and Tienen. A party of 500 German mercenaries under Lt.-Col. Eyndhouts, roaming on his left flank, managed to surprise the Dutch fortress of Schenkenschans that at the time had a garrison of only 120 soldiers, in the night of 27/28 July. A large garrison was then put in the fortress, at first under the command of Eyndhouts. The Dutch brought up reinforcements right away, but could not prevent the occupation by a Spanish army of 20,000 of the Duchy of Cleves during August and September, with the aim of linking the fort of Shenck with the main body of the Spanish Netherlands. This army was a threat to the Dutch heartland and it was therefore urgent that this threat be countered. Frederick Henry personally started the siege of Schenkenschans within days of its fall, but soon transferred command to his cousin John Maurice, Prince of Nassau-Siegen. The fort fell to the Dutch but only after a long and very costly siege that lasted through the winter months. Having secured the Dutch frontier, the Spanish forced the French back and counter-invaded the north of France towards the Somme, reaching as far as Corbie.
