= Second siege of Corbie =

- Part of the Thirty Years' War and the Franco-Spanish War (1635–59)
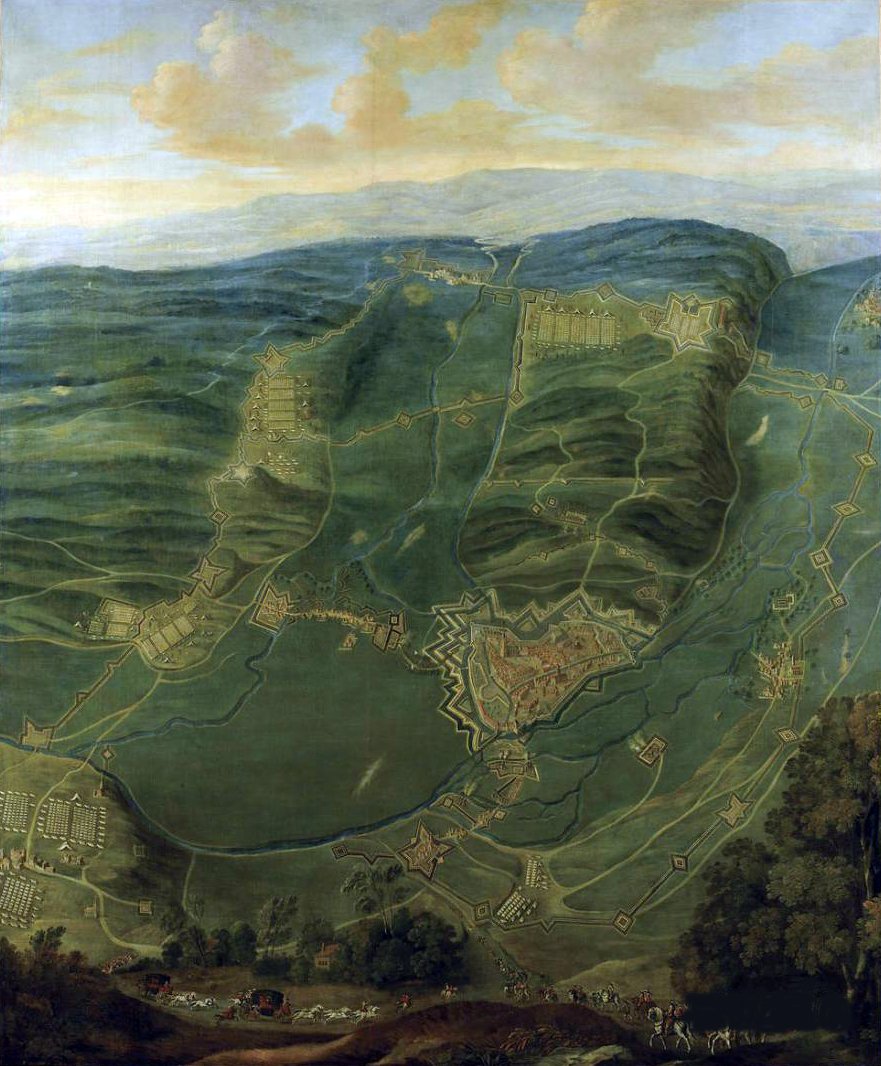
- La Reprise de Corbie par Louis XIII et Gaston d'Orléans, généralissime de l'armée de Picardie, Anonymous, c. 1640
Date	30 September – 14 November 1636
Location	Corbie, France
Result	French victory

Belligerents
France	Spain; Holy Roman Empire

Commanders and leaders
(Kingdom of France) Cardinal Richelieu	Caravaio †; Campani †

Strength
30,000 infantry 12,00 cavalry	3,000 total (~1,600 effectives by the end)

The second siege of Corbie of 1636 was begun by a French army under the command of Cardinal Richelieu on 30 September. It ended with the surrender of the Spanish garrison on 14 November.

Corbie had been captured by the Spanish Army of Flanders after the first siege on 15 August. In response, Richelieu used the arrière-ban to call up the nobility of the Paris region. The size of the army raised at Paris is unknown, but may have been as large as 30,000 infantry and 12,000 cavalry under the command of Richelieu and King Louis XIII, who arrived at the siege of Corbie in early October. Most of the Army of Flanders had retreated back across the border, leaving only a small garrison in Corbie. The Count-Duke of Olivares was to criticize the Cardinal-Infante for this decision after the loss of Corbie.

The commander of the garrison, an Italian named Caravaio, died of an infection around 15 October. His lieutenant, Campani, soon followed. On 5 November, Richelieu wrote that to take Corbie by blockade would probably take another six months. At the suggestion of the Marshal of Châtillon, however, it was decided by the king to assault the place and take it by force. The garrison offered to surrender on terms, which were agreed on 10 November. The garrison marched out on 14 November.
