= Grimonia =

4th-century Irish virgin

Saint Grimonia
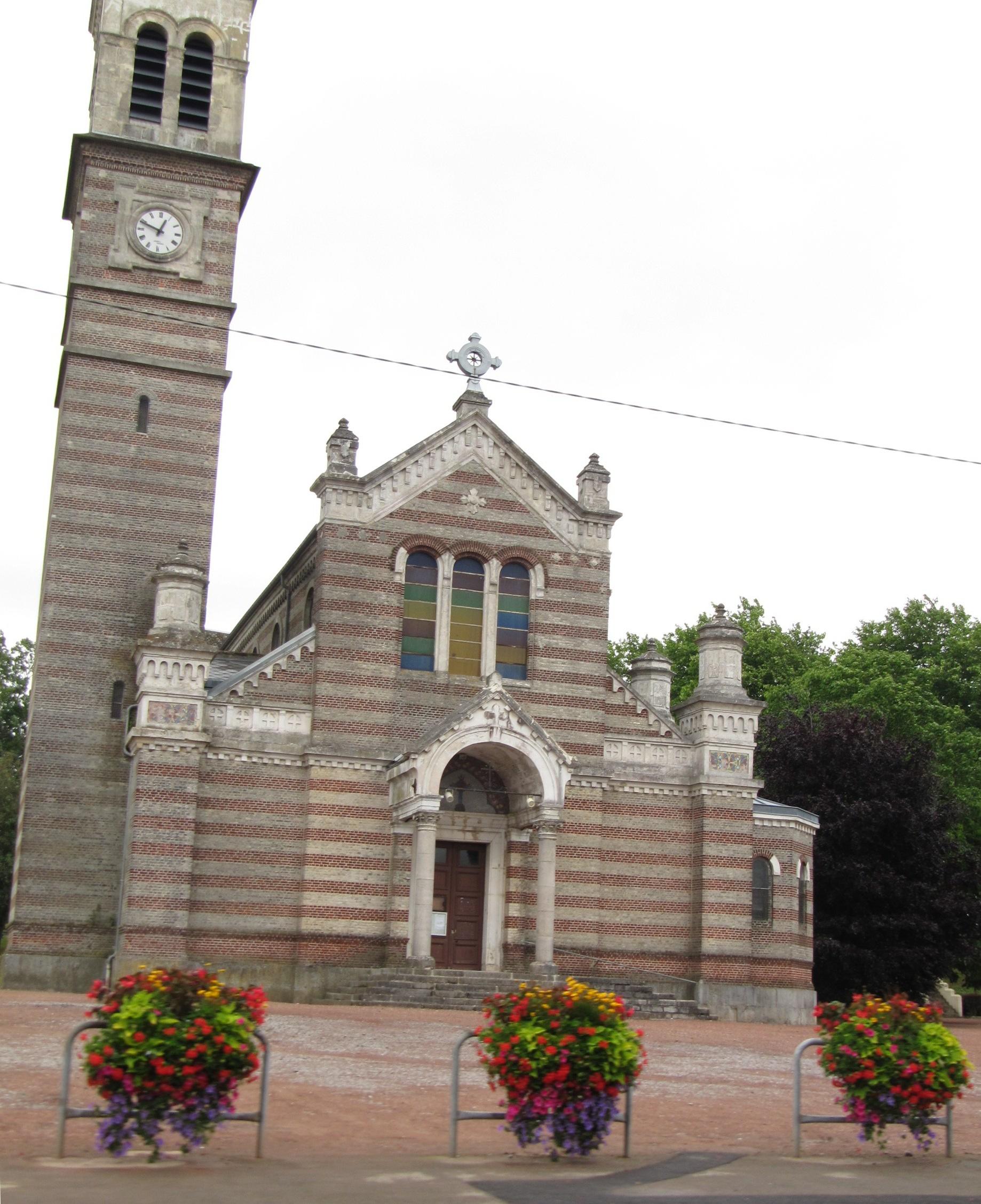
- Église Sainte-Grimonie in La Capelle
- Born: Ireland
- Died: 4th century La Capelle, Picardy
- Canonized: pre-Congregation
- Feast: 7 September

Saint Grimonia (or Grimonie, Grimony, Germana) was a 4th-century Irish virgin who was martyred in La Capelle, Picardy, France. The town is named after her chapel. Her feast day is 7 September.

== Life ==
Paul Guérin (1830–1908) published the account by Henri Congnet (1795–1870) of Soissons in his Les Petits Bollandistes vies des saints de l'Ancien et du Nouveau. In summary, Grimonia was said to have been the daughter of a pagan chieftain in Ireland. She converted to Christianity when she was aged about 12 and dedicated her life to Christ. When she reached the age to marry, her father wanted her to wed one of the noblest and wealthiest chiefs in Ireland. She ran away, but was brought back and imprisoned. She escaped through a miracle, took ship to France and landed on the coast of Gaul-Belgium where the Roman Emperor Valentinian I protected the Christians. She settled deep in the forest of Thiérache in a place named Dorunum (now La Capelle), where she spent her days in prayer, meditation and penance.

Her father sent soldiers to find her and bring her back, dead or alive. They followed her traces and eventually found her in the forest. They tried to persuade her to return to her country where a lavish wedding awaited her. Unable to convince her, they cut off her head and hid her mutilated body under a heap of dirt, then returned to Ireland. After several years a chapel was erected over her grave, which became the nucleus of the town of La Capelle. The relics were thought to have miraculous properties, and were moved several times in the years that followed, with different portions held in different places.

== Monks of Ramsgate account ==
The Monks of Ramsgate wrote in their Book of Saints (1921),

Grimonia (Germana) (St.) V.M. (Sept. 7) (4th cent.) An Irish Saint, martyred in Picardy (France), in defence of her virtue.

== Butler's account ==
The hagiographer Alban Butler (1710–1773) wrote in his Lives of the Fathers, Martyrs, and Other Principal Saints under September 7,

St. Grimonia, or Germana, V. M.

SHE was an Irish maiden of illustrious birth, and left her own country to consecrate herself to God. She was martyred in defence of her chastity in the place of her retirement in Picardy, in the diocess of Laon. On the spot a chapel was built which became famous for her relics and miracles, and grew into a considerable town, called from its original Capelle. In the wars in the fifteenth century her relics were translated to the abbey of regular canons of Hennin Lictard, between Douay and Lens, where she is honoured together with St. Proba her fellow martyr. See Stilting, ad 7 Sept. p. 80.

== Sources ==
- Butler, Alban (1823), The Lives of the Irish Saints, Extracted from the Writings of the Rev. Alban Butler, and Now Placed in Order, with a Prefixed Callender; to which is Added, an Office and Litany in Their Honour, with a Defence of the Monastic Institute. By a Cistercian Monk, J. Coyne This article incorporates text from this source, which is in the public domain.
- Congnet, Henri (1882), "Sainte Grimonie", in Paul Guérin (ed.), Les petits bollandistes vies des saints de l'Ancien et du Nouveau Testament d'apres le Père Giry (in French), vol. 10, Bloud et Barral
- St. Augustine's Abbey, Ramsgate (1921). The Book of saints : a dictionary of servants of God canonized by the Catholic Church. London: A. & C. Black, ltd. OCLC 671676136. This article incorporates text from this source, which is in the public domain.
