= Cardinal-Infante Ferdinand of Austria =

Spanish and Portuguese prince (1609-1641)

His Eminence Infante Ferdinand
- Cardinal-Deacon of Santa Maria in Portico
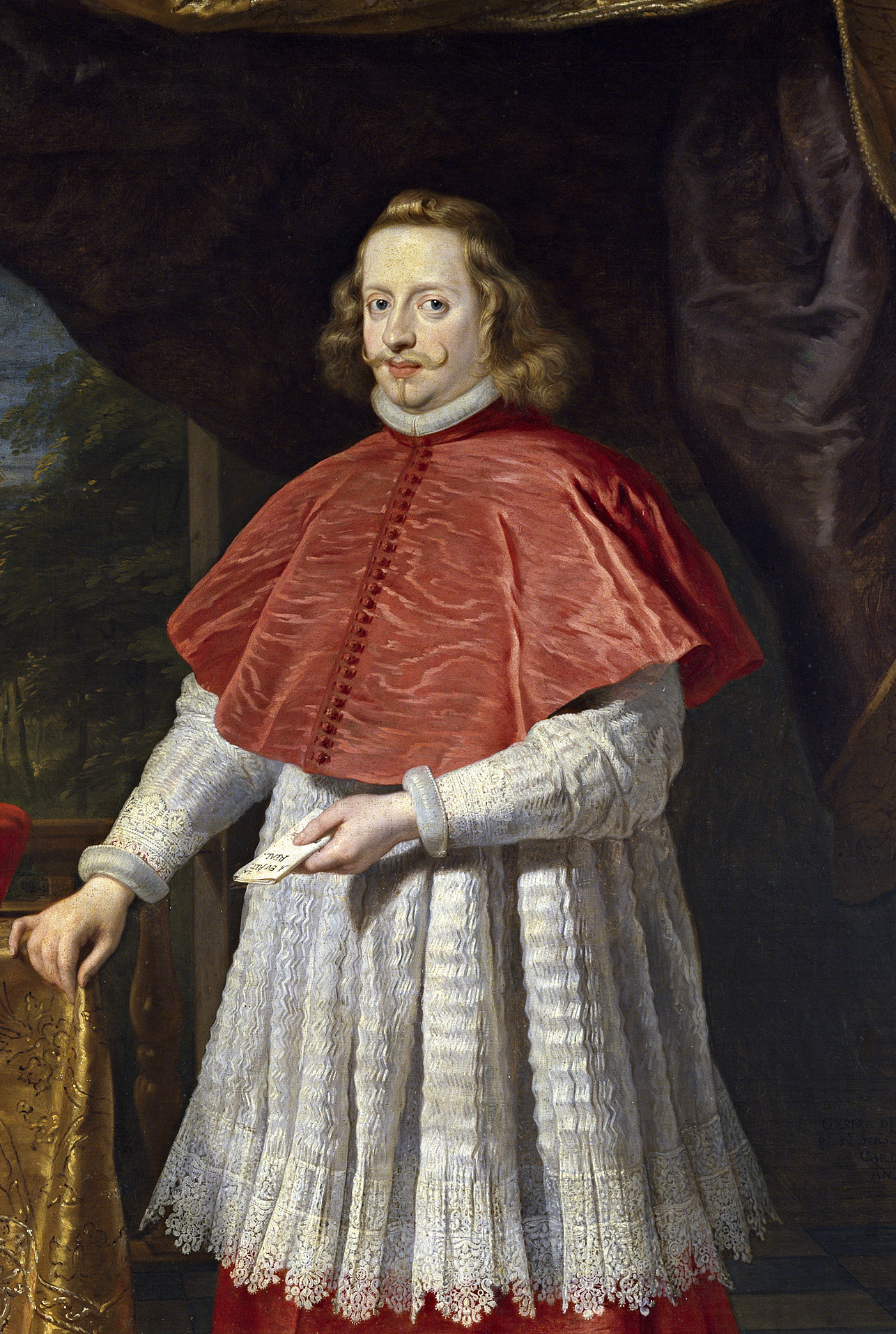
- Portrait by Gaspar de Crayer (1584–1669)
- Church: Catholic Church
- Installed: 29 July 1619
- Term ended: 9 November 1641
- Predecessor: Ferdinando Gonzaga
- Successor: Virginio Orsini
- Other posts: Apostolic Administrator of Toledo; Governor of the Spanish Netherlands; Governor of the Duchy of Milan

Orders
- Created cardinal: 29 July 1619 by Paul V
- Rank: Cardinal-Deacon

Personal details
- Born: 16 May 1609 San Lorenzo de El Escorial, Kingdom of Spain
- Died: 9 November 1641 (aged 32) Brussels, Duchy of Brabant, Spanish Netherlands
- Buried: El Escorial
- Denomination: Catholic
- Parents: Philip III of Spain; Margaret of Austria
Governmental posts
Archbishop of Toledo
In office 1 March 1620 – 9 November 1641
Preceded by	Bernardo de Sandoval y Rojas
Succeeded by	Gaspar de Borja y Velasco
Viceroy of Catalonia
In office 18 May 1632 – January 1633
Preceded by	Enrique de Aragón Folc de Cardona y Córdoba
Succeeded by	Enrique de Aragón Folc de Cardona y Córdoba
Governor of the Duchy of Milan
In office 22 January 1633 – 23 September 1633
Monarch	Philip IV
Preceded by	Gómez Suárez de Figueroa y Córdoba
Succeeded by	Gil de Albornoz y Espinosa
Governor of the Spanish Netherlands
In office 1 December 1633 – 9 November 1641
Monarch	Philip IV
Preceded by	Infanta Isabella Clara Eugenia of Spain
Succeeded by	Francisco de Melo

Military service
- Allegiance: (Spain) Spanish Empire
- Branch/service: Spanish Army
- Years of service: 1632–1641
- Rank: Captain general
- Battles/wars: Thirty Years' War: Battle of Nördlingen; Eighty Years' War: Siege of Leuven; Capture of Schenkenschans; Siege of Limbourg; Siege of Venlo; Capture of Roermond; Battle of Kallo; Battle of Geldern; Battle of Bruges; Siege of Hulst; Franco-Spanish War: Siege of Le Catelet; Siege of La Capelle; Crossing of the Somme; First siege of Corbie; Siege of Saint-Omer; Battle of Saint-Nicolas; Second siege of Aire; Battle of Lille

Cardinal-Infante Ferdinand (also known as Don Fernando de Austria, Cardenal-Infante Fernando de España and as Ferdinand von Österreich; 16 May 1609 – 9 November 1641) was a Spanish and Portuguese prince (Infante of Spain, Infante of Portugal (until 1640)), Governor of the Spanish Netherlands, Cardinal of the Holy Catholic Church, Archduke of Austria, Archbishop of Toledo (1619–1641), and a general during the Thirty Years' War, the Eighty Years' War, and the Franco-Spanish War.

Upon his first decisive victory at the Battle of Nördlingen, which led to the Peace of Prague, he proceeded to rescue the desperate situation in the Spanish Netherlands despite facing a great numerical disadvantage against the combined forces of France and the Dutch Republic. As such, the Cardinal-Infante gained a reputation as one of the best European generals of the 17th century. He is commonly considered the last great commander and strategist of Habsburg Spain, whose premature death in a critical moment helped bring about the end of Spanish hegemony in Europe.

== Biography ==
=== Youth ===
Born at the El Escorial near Madrid, Spain in 1609, he was the son of the King of Spain and Portugal, Philip III and II and Margaret of Austria, sister of Emperor Ferdinand II. His older siblings were King Philip IV and III and the French queen Anne of Austria.

From a young age, the Cardinal-Infante had always leaned towards a soldier's life. He had never shown vocation in religion, rather, as a child, he was interested in guns, horses, and war. He lacked friends growing up, and felt his interests were thrown aside in favor of political movements conducted by his father, Philip III, and the Duke of Lerma. Ferdinand was given the religious role out of his two brothers as he was the youngest, and according to royal tradition, pertained to ecclesiastical responsibilities. He was elevated to the Primacy of Spain in 1619, becoming Archbishop of Toledo. Shortly afterwards he was created Cardinal. The style Cardinal-Infante was a combination of his dignity as Cardinal and his station as a royal Prince (Infante in Spanish) of Spain.

=== Events leading to the Battle of Nördlingen ===
In 1630 the Cardinal Infante's aunt Isabella Clara Eugenia planned to make him her successor as governor of the Spanish Netherlands. To move to the Netherlands in a style befitting a governor, a strong army had to accompany him. Travel by ship from Spain was not an option as it would expose him to risk of battle with the Dutch navy in the then ongoing Eighty Years' War, so in 1633, he went to Genoa, having quit his governorship of Catalonia where he had been trained. He met with an army from Milan for a planned march through the famous Spanish Way across Lombardy, Tyrol, and Swabia, and then following the Rhine to the Netherlands. Ferdinand also planned to secure this supply route with a string of garrisons, and to support the army of King Ferdinand III of Hungary, his brother-in-law the emperor's son and heir, who was leading the Imperial army facing the Swedes in the Thirty Years' War.

Since disease delayed his travels, he sent half of his army ahead under the command of the Duke of Feria. However, this army was severely depleted during fighting with the Swedish army of Bernhard of Saxe-Weimar and Gustaf Horn. The Spanish requested 4,000 cavalry from the Imperial general Albrecht von Wallenstein, but this being denied, the Spanish had to fund the troops on their own. The Cardinal-Infante was able to continue his travels in 1634, collecting in Bavaria the remains of the army of Feria, who had died in January 1634.

=== Battle of Nördlingen ===
Meanwhile, Ferdinand of Hungary was able to defeat the Swedish army at Regensburg in July 1634. Ferdinand and his cousin the Cardinal-Infante Ferdinand then raced to merge their armies. The Swedish forces of Bernhard of Saxe-Weimar and Gustaf Horn desperately tried to prevent this merger, but were unable to catch up with Ferdinand of Hungary. The Cardinal-Infante crossed the Danube in August 1634. In September both armies were able to merge, and camped south of Nördlingen in Swabia. At that time Nördlingen was protected by a small Swedish garrison. Shortly thereafter, the armies of Bernhard of Saxe-Weimar and Gustaf Horn also reached Nördlingen, preparing the events for the decisive Battle of Nördlingen. Cardinal-Infante Ferdinand and his cousin Ferdinand then prepared for battle, ignoring the advice of the more experienced generals, such as the Imperial general Matthias Gallas. Bernhard and Horn also prepared for battle, but they were by now rivals and in disagreement with each other. They also underestimated the numerically superior enemy forces, due to incorrect reports that did not realize the Spanish Army of the late Duke of Feria had joined the Cardinal-Infante and believed that the enemy forces numbered only 7,000, not 21,000 infantry, compared to 16,000 Swedish infantry. During the battle, almost anything that could go wrong went wrong for the Swedish forces, in large part due to the efforts of the Spanish Infantry, so that the two Ferdinands achieved a great victory. The Swedish army that fled to Heilbronn was only a shadow of its former self.

=== The Spanish Netherlands ===
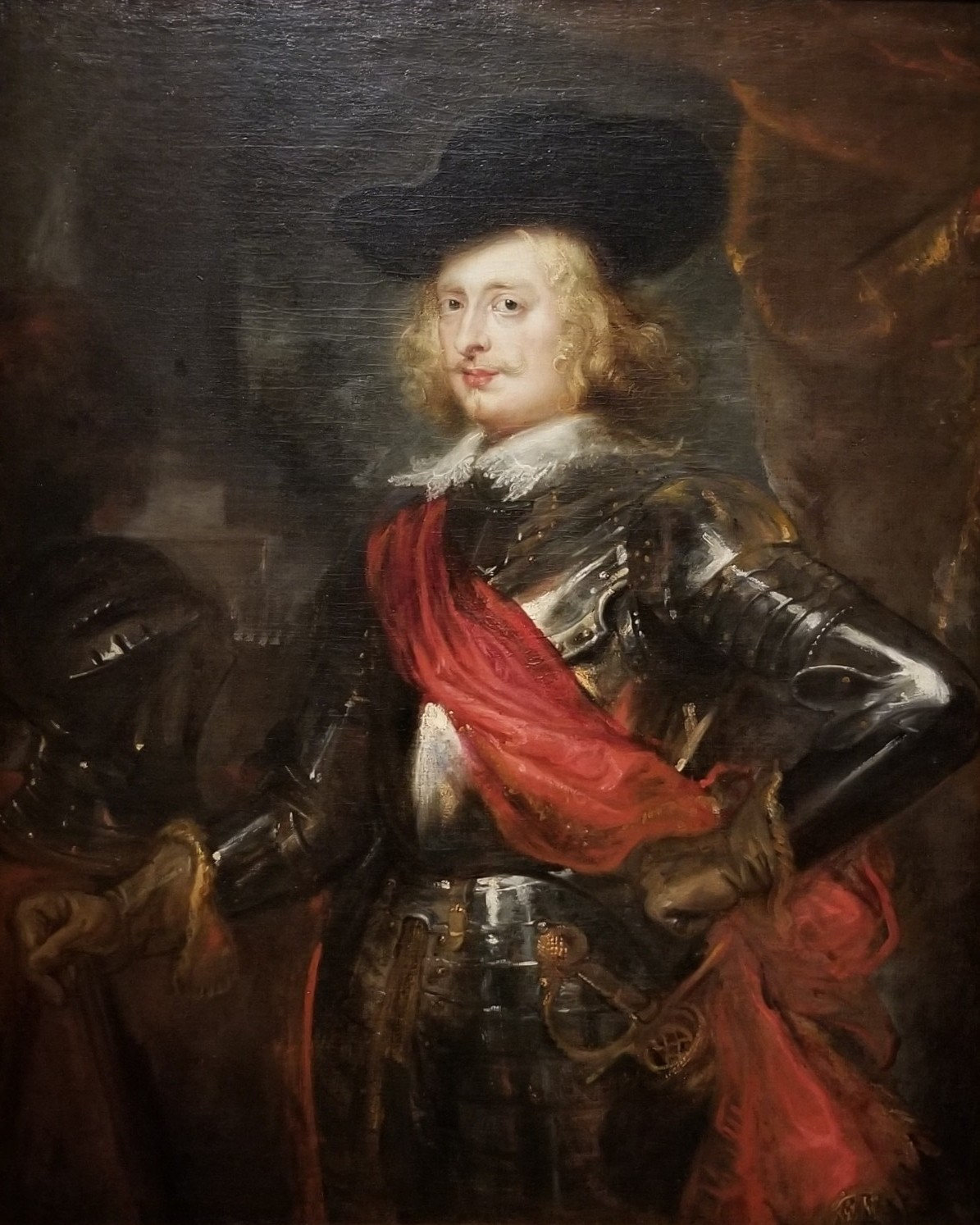
Archduke Ferdinand in 1635 depicted by Flemish painter Peter Paul Rubens. Collection of John and Mable Ringling Museum of Art

The King of Hungary tried to convince his cousin to stay and to strengthen their hold on Germany, but the Cardinal-Infante Ferdinand moved his troops almost immediately after the battle to continue to Brussels. At the end of 1634 he entered Brussels with all the glory befitting a Governor-General. Due to the unpopularity of the clergy in Brussels, he downplayed his religious status and instead emphasized his worldly ranks. Ferdinand was a skilled politician and diplomat, and quickly reformed the government and the military. He especially managed to win the support of the Flemings against France. However, his powers were secretly limited, and the leader of his army was instructed to follow Spanish orders instead of Ferdinand's orders if necessary.

In 1635, the French attacked Namur, planning to merge with the Dutch near Maastricht but were held off by well prepared defenses. At the siege of Leuven, the invading Franco-Dutch forces, suffering badly from supply problems and greatly depleted by disease and desertion, were forced to withdraw when a Spanish relief force arrived. This allowed Spanish forces under Ferdinand to go on the offensive. The Dutch were driven back and the French retreated. Ferdinand subsequently was able to capture Diest, Goch, Gennep, Limbourg, and Schenkenschanz.

"France declared war on me (on me, not on my brother Philip) and I've since then had to fight against their armies and the intrigues of our brother-in-law Louis and his relentless minister Richelieu." – Cardinal-Infante Ferdinand

Coat of Arms of the Cardinal-Infante Ferdinand of Spain.

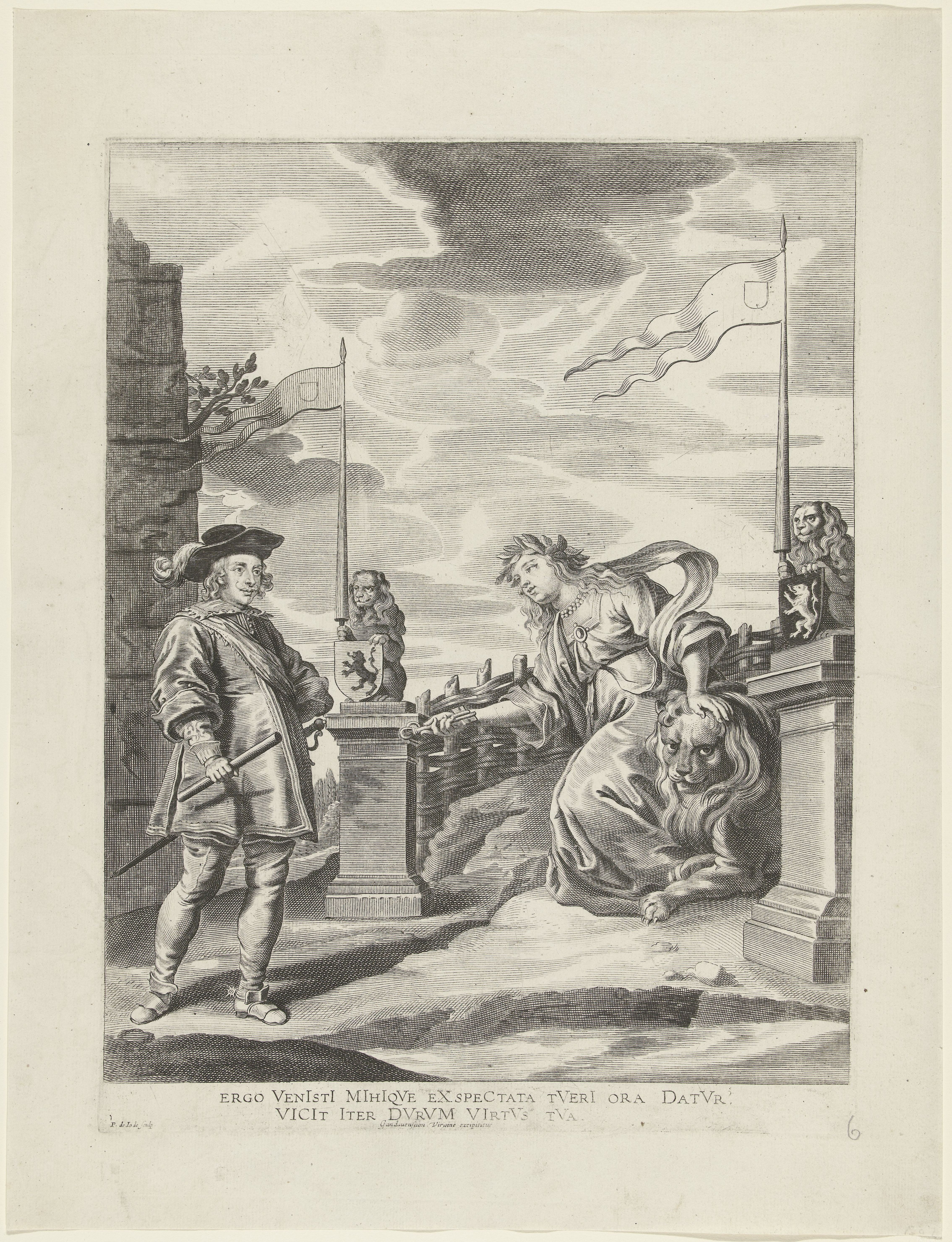
"Ferdinand Receives the Keys of the City from the Virgin of Ghent", print after a painting made by Antoon van den Heuvel for the Joyous Entry by the Cardinal-Infante Ferdinand into Ghent in 1635

In 1636, Ferdinand disempowered the last Protestant priests in the Spanish Netherlands, and continued his military counter-offensive by capturing Hirson, Le Catelet, and La Capelle, and securing Luxembourg using the usual mixed nationalities typical of the early modern age that included Croatian troops, and reaching as far a stronghold in France as Corbie during the Crossing of the Somme, threatening Paris.

In 1637, with Spanish forces concentrated in the fight with the French, a relatively lightly defended Breda, that had been under Spanish control for twelve years, was recaptured by the Dutch after a 3-month siege by the Prince of Orange. The loss of Breda was a blow to Spanish prestige but was of much less strategic significance than the gains made by Ferdinand during its course in taking the Dutch towns of Venlo and Roermond in the Meuse valley, effectively cutting Maastricht from the Dutch Republic and, thus, preventing further Dutch attacks on the Spanish Netherlands from the east. In the southern front Ferdinand lost the towns of La Capelle, Landrecies, and Damvillers to the French, but then he forced them to retreat south of Maubeuge.

In 1638, Ferdinand's army successfully defended Antwerp, Saint-Omer and Geldern from the Dutch and French armies. His defense of Antwerp led to the Battle of Kallo, where Ferdinand achieved a crushing victory over the Dutch army while heavily outnumbered. In a letter to his brother the King of Spain shortly afterwards, Ferdinand described the battle as "the greatest victory which your Majesty's arms have achieved since the war in the Low Countries began".

In 1639, Ferdinand managed again to thwart Franco-Dutch plans. The Dutch navy destroyed an important Spanish fleet in the Battle of the Downs, off the English coast, but it failed to prevent most of the army it was carrying, some 7,000 to 10,500 infantry, from landing at Dunkirk. While Ferdinand frustrated the Prince of Orange's move against Hulst, an Imperial-Spanish army under Count Piccolomini destroyed the main French army in the south at the Battle of Thionville.

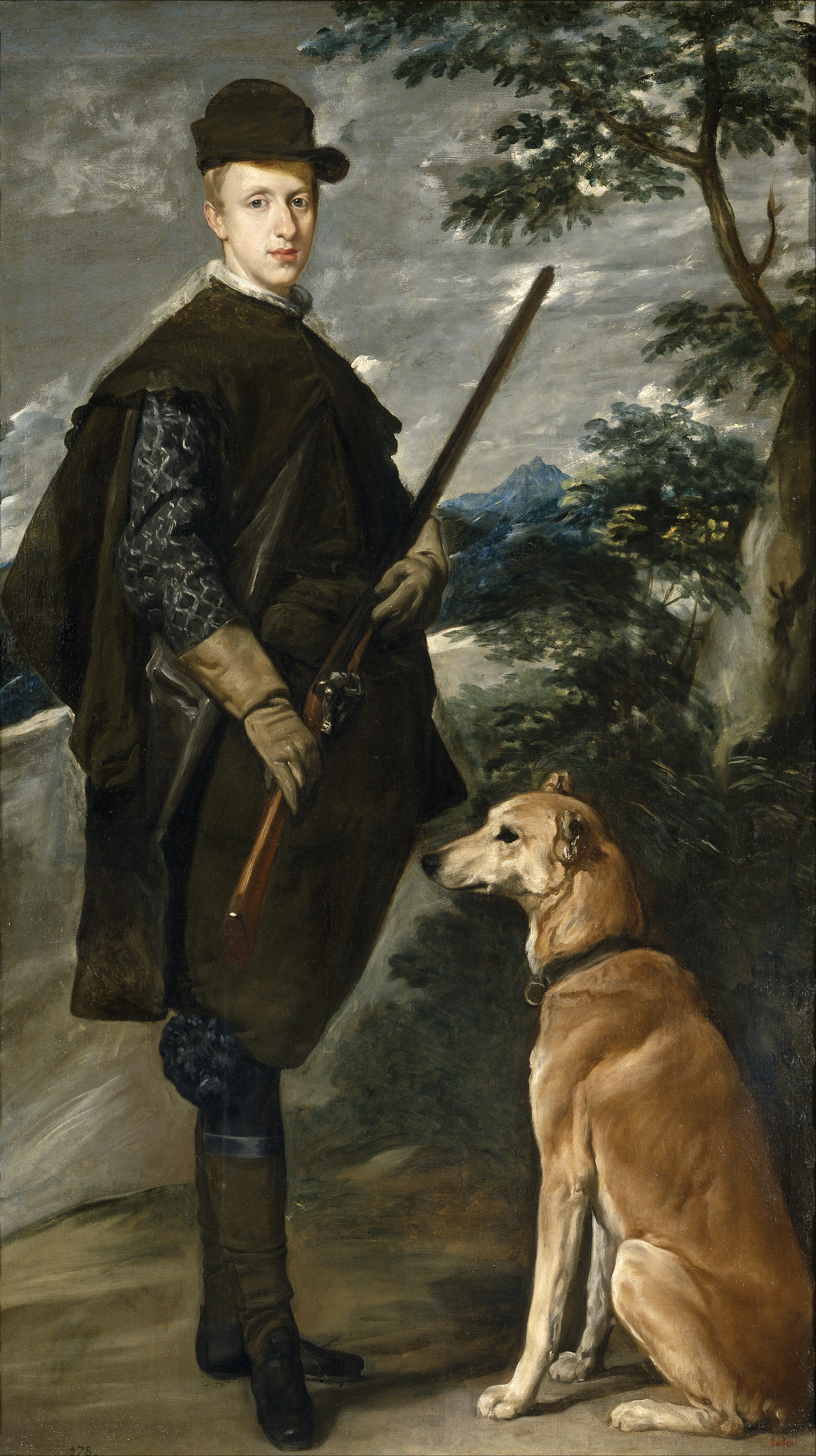
Cardinal-Infante Ferdinand of Austria as Actaeon by Diego Velázquez

In 1640, Dutch attacks on Hulst and Bruges were repelled by the local Spanish garrisons under the Cardinal-Infante. In the south, after a failed attack on the Spanish fortress of Charlemont in Givet, a combined Dutch and French army under Gaspard III de Coligny and Frederick Henry launched a great offensive upon Arras, the capital of the County of Artois. The city finally surrendered on 9 August, marking the first victory of importance for the French in the war after five years of fighting.

=== Fall from grace ===
More dangerous than his military enemies, however, were his enemies at the Spanish court. Numerous rumours and lies floated about, and it was claimed that Ferdinand was planning to become an independent ruler of the Spanish Netherlands with the help of the French King, an enemy of Spain. This rumour was enhanced by another rumour that the French court was planning to marry Ferdinand to Anne Marie Louise d'Orléans, Duchess of Montpensier, the (eldest) daughter of Gaston, Duke of Orléans, the French king's brother. The former claim was untrue however his sister Anne of Austria did suggest a marriage between Ferdinand and Anne Marie Louise, the greatest heiress in Europe. Making matters worse, the Spanish empire was under intense pressure militarily and financially; the Cardinal-Infante was even given conflicting orders to send troops to Spain to aid against the 1640 Portuguese uprising.

=== Death and succession ===
Ferdinand fell ill during battles in 1641 and died on 9 November 1641 in Brussels at age 32. It was thought that death was caused by exhaustion combined with ill health. Reports talk about a stomach ulcer, but rumors also claimed that he was poisoned. Before his death, he had an illegitimate daughter, Marie Anne de la Croix, born in Brussels in 1641 and died a nun in Madrid in 1715. The Cardinal-Infante would leave behind quite a legacy which was unfortunately never exceeded. The Spanish Netherlands would only begin its decline not long after his death. His body was brought to Spain in 1643, and 12,000 requiem Masses were performed in accordance with his last wishes. He was buried in the Panteón de Infantes.

Disputes about his successor as the Governor-General of the Spanish Netherlands destroyed the alliance between the Emperor in Vienna and the Spanish in Madrid. The Emperor (by now the Cardinal-Infante's old comrade in arms, Ferdinand III) favored his brother Archduke Leopold Wilhelm of Austria, a militarily unfortunate but otherwise capable ruler. Madrid favored John of Austria the Younger, the twelve-year-old illegitimate son of Philip IV and the actress María Calderón. The inauguration of the unpopular bastard was delayed, and the rule of the Spanish Netherlands was taken over by Francisco de Mello, Marquis of Terceira.

== Ancestry ==
Ancestors of Cardinal-Infante Ferdinand of Austria

16. Philip I of Castile (= 24)
8. Charles V, Holy Roman Emperor (= 22)
17. Joanna I of Castile (= 25)
4. Philip II of Spain
18. Manuel I of Portugal
9. Isabella of Portugal (= 23)
19. Maria of Aragon
2. Philip III of Spain
20. Ferdinand I, Holy Roman Emperor (= 12, 30)
10. Maximilian II, Holy Roman Emperor
21. Anne of Bohemia and Hungary (= 13, 31)
5. Anna of Austria (≠ 15)
22. Charles V, Holy Roman Emperor (= 8)
11. Maria of Austria
23. Isabella of Portugal (= 9)
1. Cardinal-Infante Ferdinand
24. Philip I of Castile (= 16)
12. Ferdinand I, Holy Roman Emperor (= 20, 30)
25. Joanna I of Castile (= 17)
6. Charles II, Archduke of Inner Austria
26. Vladislaus II of Hungary and Bohemia
13. Anne of Bohemia and Hungary (= 21, 31)
27. Anne of Foix-Candale
3. Margaret of Austria
28. William IV, Duke of Bavaria
14. Albert V, Duke of Bavaria
29. Marie of Baden-Sponheim
7. Maria Anna of Bavaria
30. Ferdinand I, Holy Roman Emperor (= 12, 20)
15. Anna of Austria (≠ 5)
31. Anne of Bohemia and Hungary (= 13, 21)

== Male-line family tree ==
House of Habsburg

Original line
Albert; Count of Habsburg c. 1188–1239
Rudolf I of Germany c. 1218–1291
Albert I of Germany; 1255–1308	Hartmann; 1263–1281	Rudolf II; Duke of Austria; 1270–1290
Rudolf I of Bohemia; 1281–1307	Frederick the Fair c. 1289–1330	Leopold I Duke of Austria; 1290–1326	Albert II; Duke of Austria; 1298–1358	Henry the Friendly; 1299–1327	Otto; Duke of Austria; 1301–1339	John; Parricida c. 1290–1312/1313
Albertinian line	Leopoldian line
Rudolf IV; Duke of Austria; 1339–1365	Frederick III; 1347–1362	Albert III; Duke of Austria; 1349–1395	Leopold III; Duke of Austria; 1351–1386	Frederick II; Duke of Austria; 1327–1344	Leopold II; Duke of Austria; 1328–1344
Albert IV; Duke of Austria; 1377–1404	William; Duke of Austria c. 1370–1406	Leopold IV; Duke of Austria; 1371–1411	Ernest; Duke of Austria; 1377–1424	Frederick IV; Duke of Austria; 1382–1439
Albert II of Germany; 1397–1439	Frederick III; HRE; 1415–1493	Albert VI; Archduke of Austria; 1418–1463	Sigismund; Archduke of Austria; 1427–1496
Ladislaus the Posthumous; 1440–1457	Maximilian I HRE; 1459–1519
Philip I of Castile; 1478–1506
Spanish / Iberian line	Austrian / HRE line
Charles V HRE; 1500–1558	Ferdinand I HRE; 1503–1564
Philip II of Spain; 1527–1598	Maximilian II; HRE; 1527–1576	Ferdinand II; Archduke of Austria; 1529–1595	Charles II; Archduke of Austria; 1540–1590
Carlos; Prince of Asturias; 1545–1568	Philip III of Spain; 1578–1621	Rudolf II; HRE; 1552–1612	Ernest of Austria; 1553–1595	Matthias; HRE; 1557–1619	Maximilian III; Archduke of Austria; 1558–1618	Albert VII; Archduke of Austria; 1559–1621	Wenceslaus; Archduke of Austria; 1561–1578	Andrew; Margrave of Burgau; 1558–1600	Charles; Margrave of Burgau; 1560–1618	Ferdinand II; HRE; 1578–1637	Maximilian Ernest of Austria; 1583–1616	Leopold V Archduke of Austria; 1586–1632	Charles of Austria; 1590–1624
Philip IV of Spain; 1605–1665	Charles of Austria; 1607–1632	Ferdinand of Austria; 1609–1641	John-Charles of Austria; 1605–1619	Ferdinand III; HRE; 1608–1657	Leopold Wilhelm of Austria; 1614–1662	Ferdinand Charles; Archduke of Austria; 1628–1662	Sigismund Francis; Archduke of Austria; 1630–1665
Balthasar Charles; Prince of Asturias; 1629–1646	Charles II of Spain; 1661–1700	Ferdinand IV; King of the Romans; 1633–1654	Leopold I HRE; 1640–1705	Charles Joseph of Austria; 1649–1664
Joseph I HRE; 1678–1711	Charles VI; HRE; 1685–1740
Lorraine
Maria Theresa; HRE; 1740–1780	Francis I HRE; 1745–1765
Habsburg-Lorraine
Joseph II; HRE; 1765–1790	Leopold II; HRE; 1790–1792
Francis II; HRE; 1792–1806

== Notes ==
Cardinal-Infante Ferdinand of Austria House of Habsburg Born: 16 May 1609 Died: 9 November 1641
Government offices
Preceded by The Duke of Feria	Governor of the Duchy of Milan; 1633–1634	Succeeded by Cardinal Gil de Albornoz
Preceded by Infanta Isabella Clara Eugenia	Governor of the Habsburg Netherlands; 1634–1641	Succeeded by The Marquis of Terceira
Catholic Church titles
Preceded by Bernardo de Sandoval y Rojas as Archbishop	Apostolic Administrator of the Archdiocese of Toledo; 1620–1641	Succeeded by Gaspar de Borja y Velasco as Archbishop
