= La Capelle =

- Commune
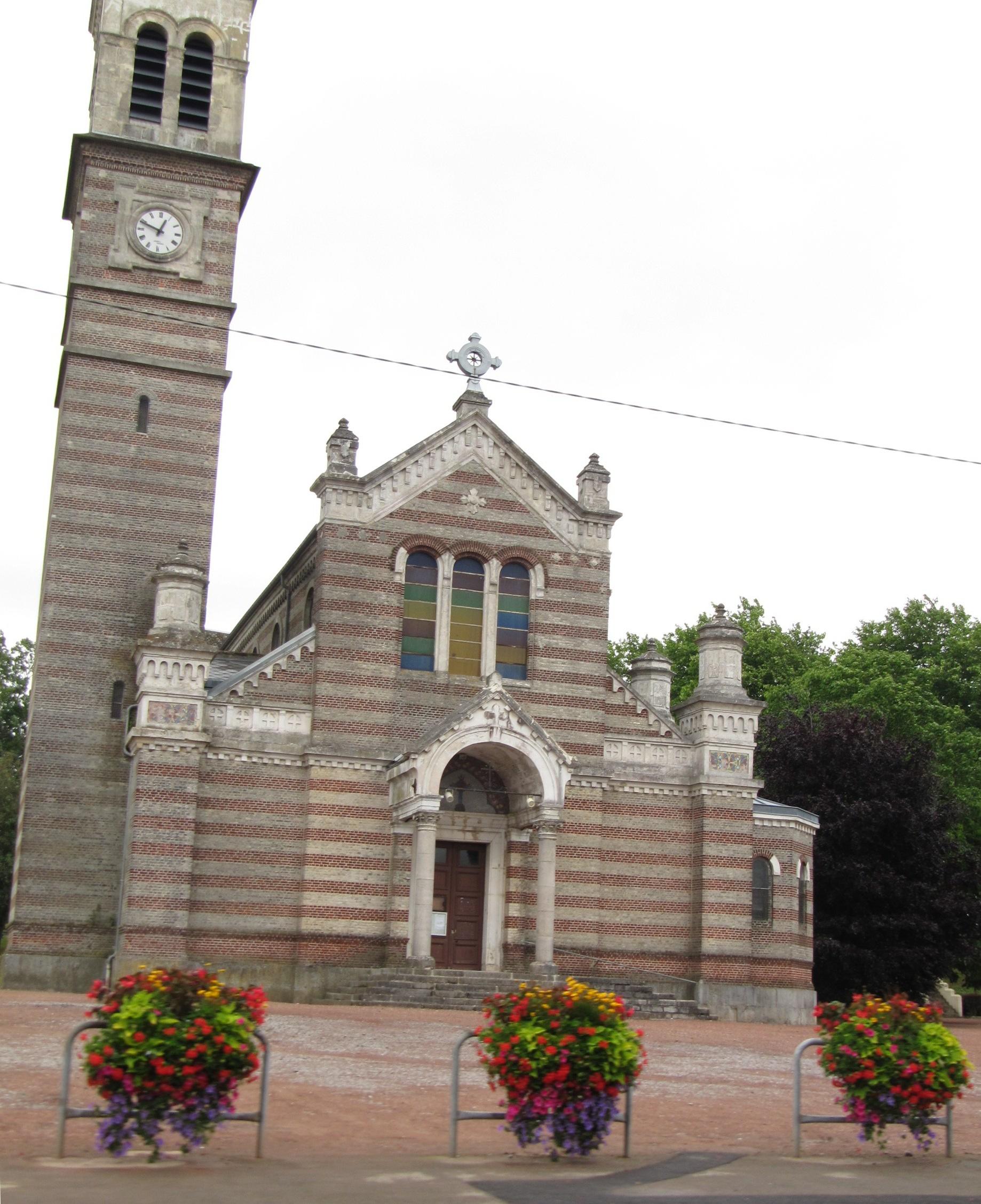
- The church of La Capelle

- Coat of arms
- Location of La Capelle
- Location within France Location within Hauts-de-France
- Coordinates: 49°58′41″N 3°55′02″E
- Country: France
- Region: Hauts-de-France
- Department: Aisne
- Arrondissement: Vervins
- Canton: Vervins
- Intercommunality: Thiérache du Centre

Government
  - Mayor (2026–32): Johann Wéry
- Area^{1}: 12.26 km^{2} (4.73 sq mi)
- Elevation: 228 m (748 ft)
- Highest elevation: 231 m (758 ft)
- Lowest elevation: 174 m (571 ft)
- Population (2023): 1,745
  - Density: 142.3/km^{2} (368.6/sq mi)
- Time zone: UTC+01:00 (CET)
  - Summer (DST): UTC+02:00 (CEST)
- INSEE/Postal code: 02141 /02260
- ^{1} French Land Register data, which excludes lakes, ponds, glaciers > 1 km^{2} (0.386 sq mi or 247 acres) and river estuaries.

La Capelle is a commune in the Aisne department in Hauts-de-France in northern France. Its inhabitants are called Capellois (plural Capelloises).

== Geography ==
La Capelle had a station on the Busigny-Hirson railway line, which operated from 1885 to 1959 (and 1977 for freight traffic between Le Nouvion and La Capelle).

== Toponymy ==
The name of La Capelle comes from the Picard term designating a chapel. This chapel is dedicated to Saint Grimony.

== History ==
The village was founded by Saint Grimony, a saint of Irish origin of the 4th century. The village was of strategic importance, defending the French border against Avesnes-sur-Helpe, which was Spanish. It is 16 km from the Belgian border.

On 7 November 1918, at the end of World War I, it was at La Capelle that the German plenipotentiaries (headed by Matthias Erzberger), who had come to negotiate the armistice, crossed the front lines and met the commander Bourbon Busset. They were taken by car to Homblières, then to Tergnier where a special train was waiting to bring them to the clearing of Rethondes in the forest of Compiègne where on the morning of the 8th Marshal Foch, with the allied delegation, was awaiting them in his command train.

During World War II in 1940, during the Phoney War, General Paul Barbe installed at La Capelle the command post of his division, the 4th Light Cavalry Division.

== Heraldry ==
The top half of the coat of arms is azure with a silver crenelated wall, flanked by two towers of the same, with two gold lions facing away from each other, holding silver swords. The bottom half is in gules, with four gold bezants (coins).

== Politics and Administration ==
List of mayors
Period	Identity	Label	Quality
Before 1875 - After 1876	Mamburg		
1957-1997	Louis Hennebelle	UDR - RPR	Doctor, General Counselor
2001–2020	Guy Méresse	DVD - LR	Retired Public Service.
2020–incumbent	Johann Wéry		

== Places and monuments ==
Sainte-Grimonie Church of La Capelle

A Military bollard on the roadside of Avesnes-sur-Helpe is a Roman road marker. It is made of limestone and is cylindrical in shape.

Renowned racecourse: the racecourse of La Capelle, created in 1874.

The Villa Pasques 10, which was the place where the German plenipotentiary made contact with the allies to negotiate the armistice of 1918. Since 1992, the Villa Pasques has been the seat of the Community of Communes of the Thiérache Center.

=== Flower City ===
Two flowers awarded in 2009 by the Council of Towns and Villages Fleuris of France in the Contest of the towns and villages in bloom.

== Population ==
Historical population
Year	Pop.	±% p.a.
1968	2,065	—
1975	2,196	+0.88%
1982	2,123	−0.48%
1990	2,149	+0.15%
1999	2,007	−0.76%
2007	1,896	−0.71%
2012	1,823	−0.78%
2017	1,788	−0.39%
2023	1,745	−0.40%
Source: INSEE

== See also ==
- Communes of the Aisne department
