= Gaspare Aselli =

Italian physician

Doctor Gaspare Aselli
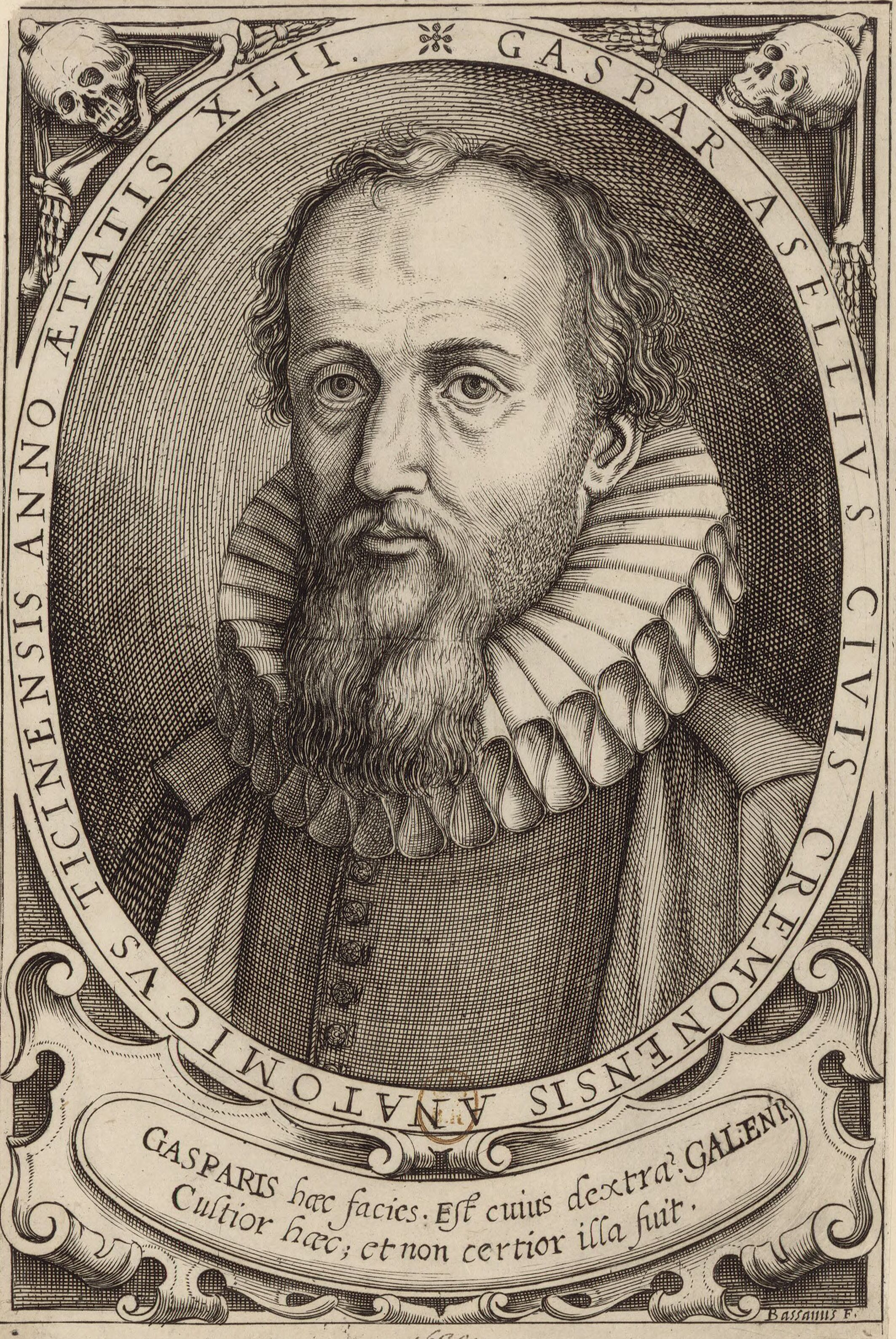
- Portrait of Gaspare Aselli by Cesare Bassano
- Born: 1581; Cremona, Duchy of Milan
- Died: 9 September 1625 (aged 43–44); Milan, Duchy of Milan
- Education: University of Pavia
- Occupations: Physician, anatomist, surgeon, university teacher
- Known for: Discovery of the lacteal vessels of the lymphatic system
- Parent: Benedetto Aselli
- Scientific career
- Workplaces: University of Pavia

Gaspare Aselli (or Asellio) (c. 1581 – 9 September 1625) was an Italian physician noted for the discovery of the lacteal vessels of the lymphatic system. Aselli discovered (or rediscovered) the chylous vessels, and studied systematically the significance of these vascular structures.

== Life ==
Gaspare Aselli was born in Cremona of a wealthy patrician family. He attended the University of Pavia, where he obtained degrees in medicine, surgery and philosophy. He continued his studies in Milan, where he practiced medicine with great distinction. The Milanese Senate named him an honorary citizen “by virtue of his superlative qualities as doctor and scientist”. In 1612 he was appointed Head Surgeon of the Spanish Armada in Italy. He became professor of anatomy and surgery at the University of Pavia shortly before his death in 1625 at the age of 44. He is buried in Milan, in the church of San Pietro Celestino, near Porta Venezia.

== Contributions ==
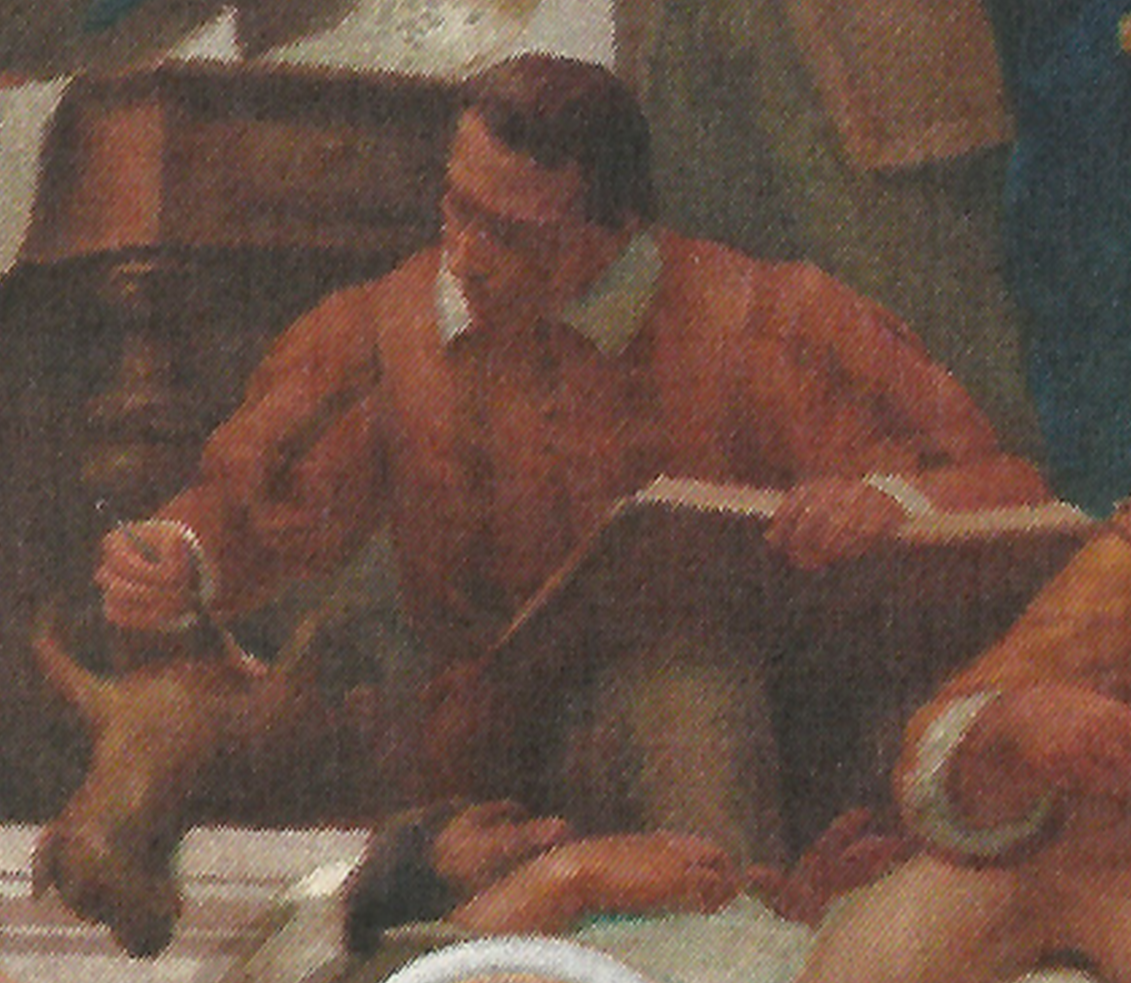
Gaspare Aselli performing vivisection on a dog, a detail of Medicina do Renascimento by Veloso Salgado

Aselli is regarded as the discoverer of the lacteals, or the set of vessels which absorb or suck up the nutritious portion of the food of animals, i.e., the chyle from the upper part of the intestinal tube, in order to convey it to the heart and lungs, so that it may become incorporated in the circulating fluid or blood. On 23 July 1622, during a vivisection performed on a dog, he saw these vessels, and from the white color of the fluid they contained, from the milk-like character of which is derived the name of lacteal, distinguished them from the other vessels, and demonstrated them in his lectures. Aselli observed that the vessels were filled only after digestion, at other times being scarcely visible. He traced them to a group mesenteric glands still known as “Aselli's gland” or “pancreas Aselli”, and believed that they passed on into the liver, thus failing to trace their true ending; it was not until Jean Pecquet's discovery of the thoracic duct and its continuity with the lacteal vessels that the process of absorption was clearly established. He recognised the presence of valves in these vessels and showed that they prevented a backward flow.

The lacteals were termed the fourth kind of vessels (the other three being the artery, vein and nerve, which was then believed to be a type of vessel), and disproved Galen's assertion that chyle was carried by the veins.

By highlighting the existence of chyliferous vessels and lymphatic circulation, Aselli’s discovery greatly contributed to debunking Galen's generally accepted theory that the liver was the source of the blood – a belief that was definitely disproved by William Harvey in his seminal work De Motu Cordis.

== De lactibus sive Lacteis venis ==
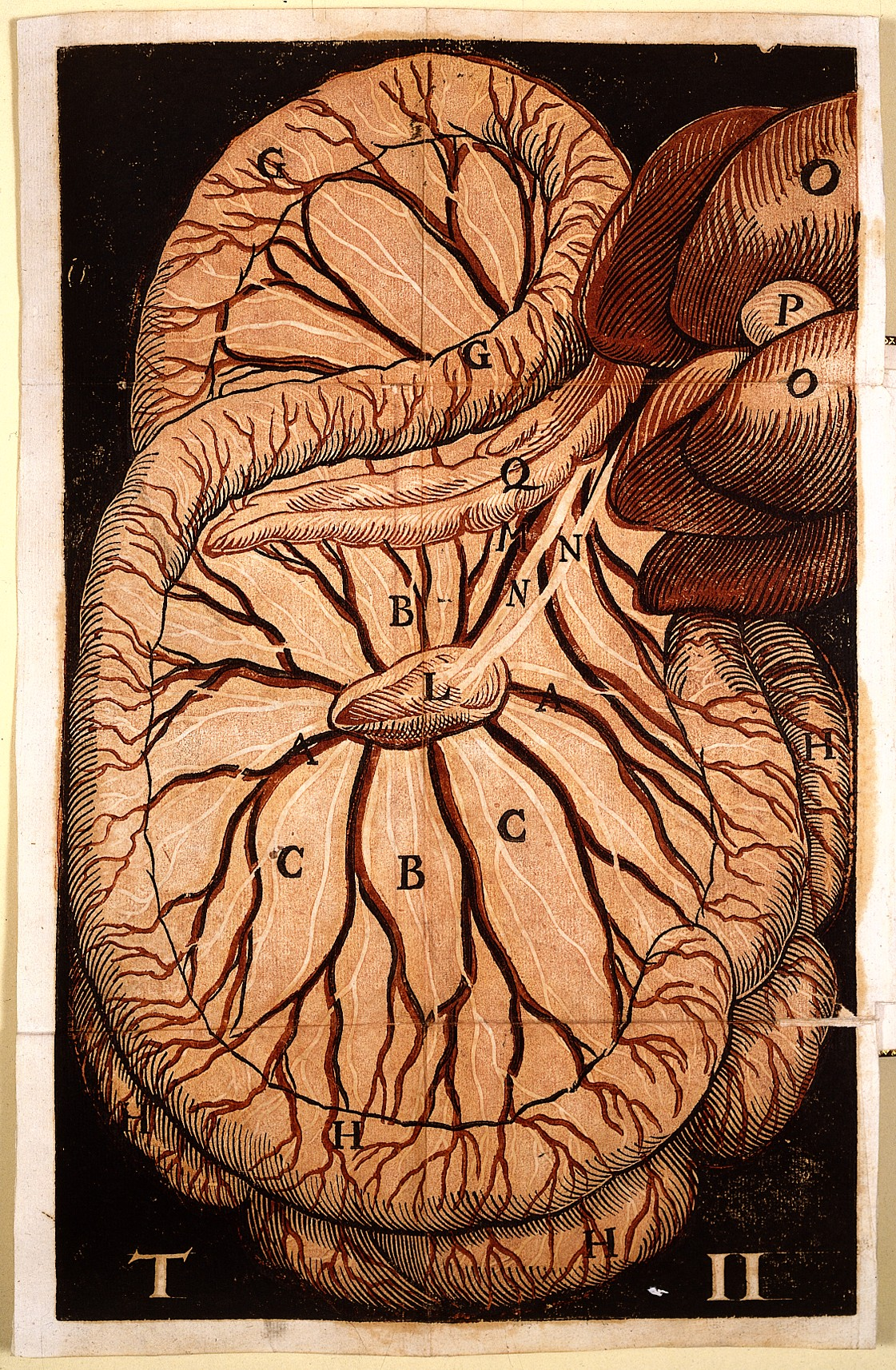
Lacteals in dog's mesentery, from Aselli, De Lactibus..., 1627.

Aselli drew up, but never published, an account of his discovery. His description of the lacteals, De lactibus sive Lacteis venis, was published after his death, in 1627 at Milan, thanks to the liberality of Fabri de Peiresc. In its use of polychrome woodcut-print to more accurately distinguish the different types of vessels depicted (the arteries and blood vessels are represented in red, the lacteal channels in black, etc.), De lactibus was the first publication to use colored illustrations in the interest of scientific accuracy. The striking woodcuts, which appear in this edition only, have been attributed to either Cesare Bassano or to his associate Domenico Falcini. Aselli's work was later reprinted several times all over Europe: Basel (1628), Leiden (1640, and again 1641), Amsterdam (1645). It was included in the 1645 Opera omnia of the Padua anatomist Adriaan van den Spiegel.

Shortly before De motu cordis (1628) appeared, Aselli anticipated William Harvey's monumental discovery of the circulation of the blood. In his De lacteis, indeed, he wrote these remarkable words about the circulation:

Perhaps it would not be absurd to suppose that the blood brought to the lung by the vena arteriosa (i.e. the pulmonary artery), mingled with the air attenuated by the lung and returned to the left ventricle through the arteria venosa (pulmonary vein). Perhaps it is not necessary to imagine the passages that Galen supposed to exist in the interventricular septum, which could not have any use.-De lactibus, 1627, p. 16.

Together with William Harvey's discovery of the circulation of blood, Aselli's discovery of the lacteal vessels ranks among most important physiological discoveries of the XVII century. The experimentation on living animals, and particularly the vivisection used by Gaspare Aselli provided the basis for much of the subsequent investigation of the human physiology.

== Works ==
- De lactibus, sive lacteis venis, quarto vasorum mesaraicorum genere novo invento. Mediolani: Apud Jo Baptistam Bidellium. 1627.
- De lactibus, sive lacteis venis. Leiden: Johannes Maire. 1640.
