= Farewell to the Mountains =

Passage from The Betrothed by Alessandro Manzoni

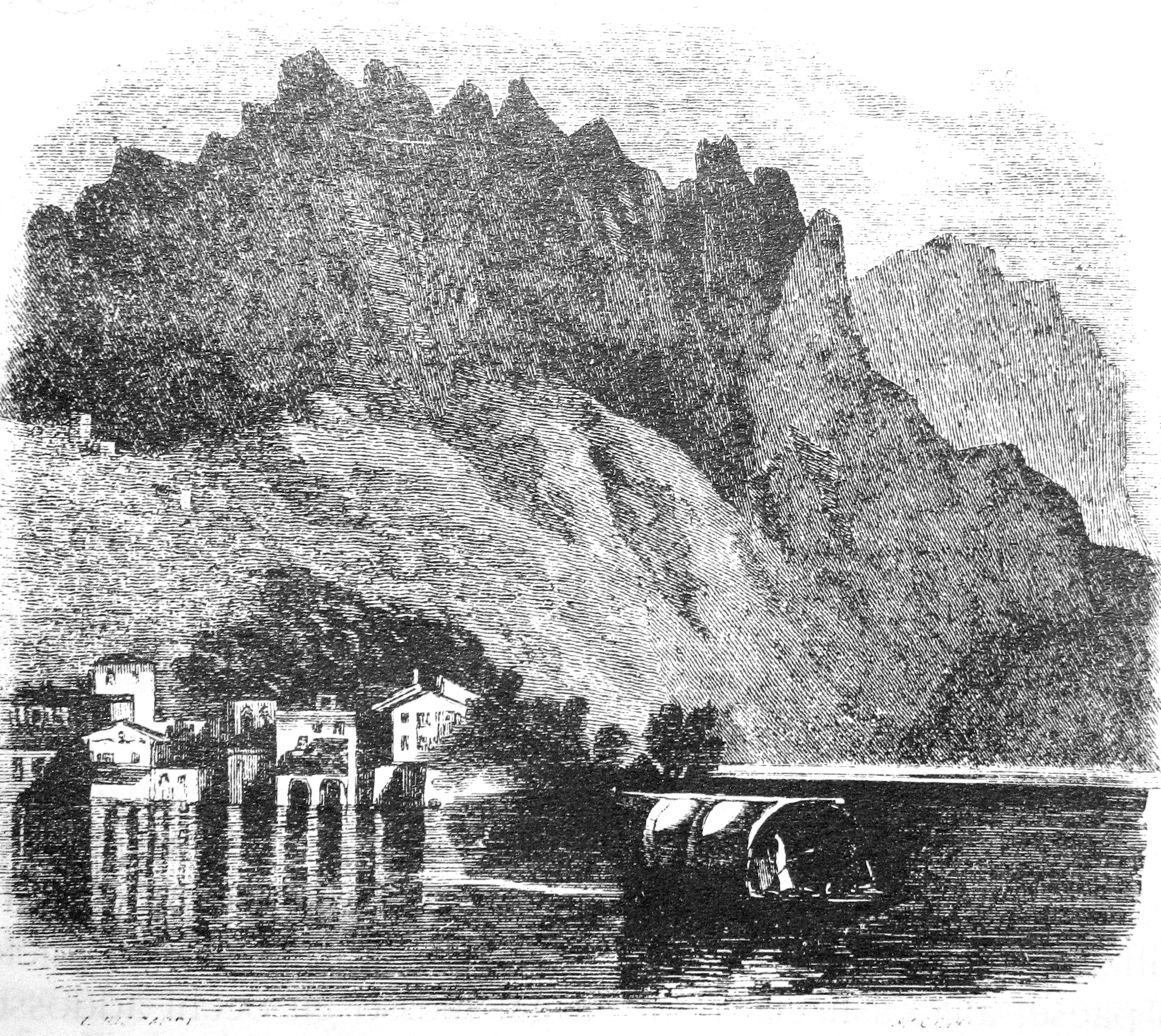
The Farewell to the Mountains as illustrated by Luigi Riccardi in the 1840 edition

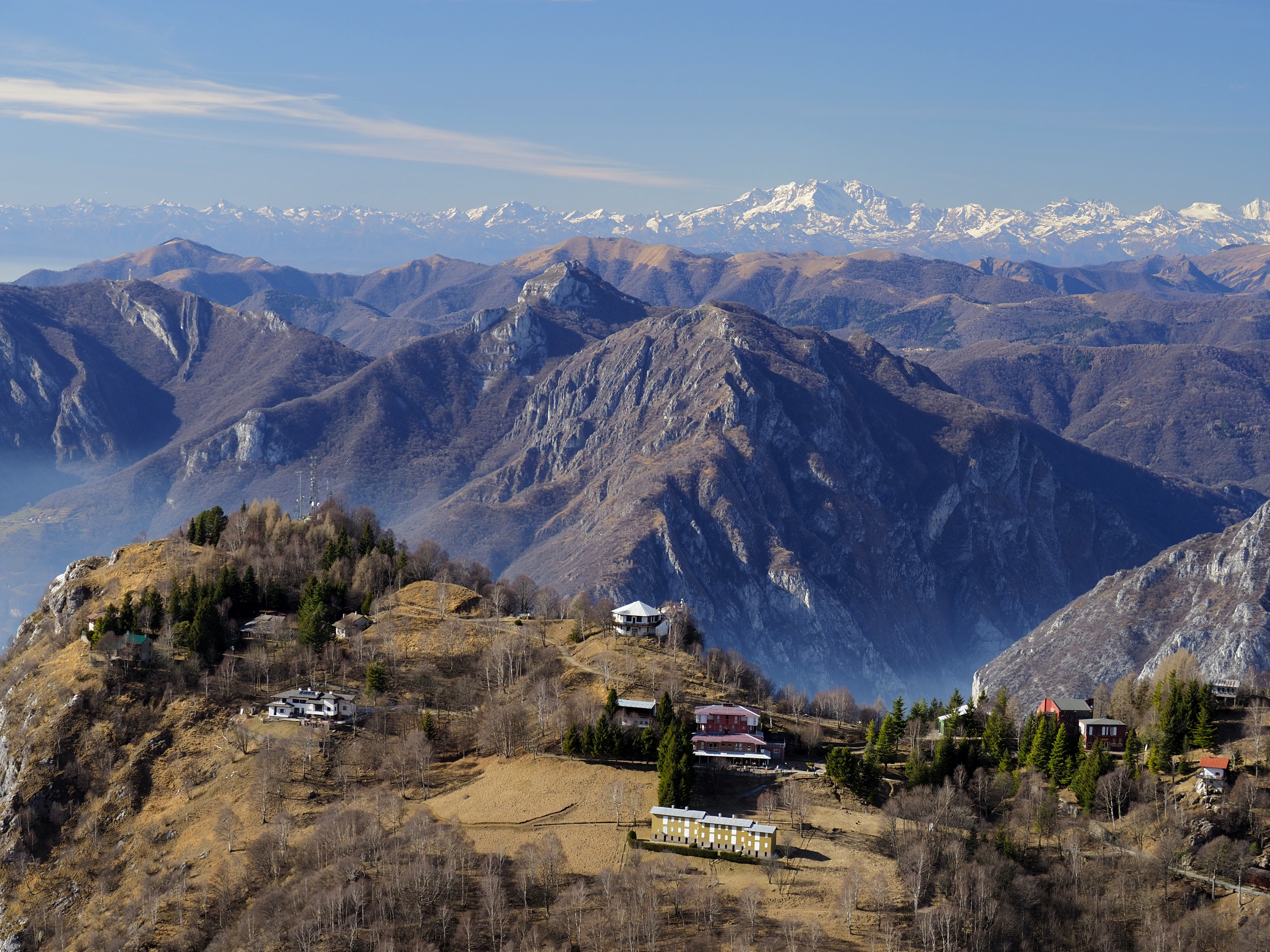
Mountain view from the Pizzo d'Erna in Lecco

Farewell to the Mountains (Italian: Addio ai monti) is a famous passage of the VIII chapter of The Betrothed by Alessandro Manzoni.

In the novel, Lucia and Renzo are escaping from their native village near Lecco by barge because Don Rodrigo wants to force the young woman to marry him; Lucia sees the place where she used to live and the suitor's castle, so she grieves and begins to cry. Manzoni reports Lucia's reflections and feelings.

== Short analysis ==
This passage is the most lyrical of the entire novel: critics describe it as a poem in prose; in effect we can find some verses (decasyllables and hendecasyllables) hidden in the text. The register is high-level. The tone is idyllic, but don Rodrigo's presence in some measure darkens and fills with gloom the situation: because of him Lucia begins to cry and to reflect. This passage's purpose is to show character's and writer's feelings, so it is similar to the chorus in Manzoni's tragedies. In his novel the author always wants to control the narration, so he ends the idyllic pause very sharply and restarts narrating.

The theme of emigration is very important, but it is not the only one: the passage is also about religion and divine providence, that is The Betrothed's fil rouge (the author writes that God disturbs his sons' joy to donate them, at the end, a bigger joy).

== Sources ==
- Luperini, Romano; Catadi, Pietro; Marchiani, Lidia; Marchese, Franco (2011). Il nuovo La scrittura e l'interpretazione (in Italian). Vol. 1. Palumbo Editore. ISBN 978-88-8020-846-4.
- Gallardo, Piero, ed. (1964). Il tesoro della prosa e della poesia italiane (in Italian). Vol. V. Verona. (Selection from Reader's Digest.)
