= Cesare Bassano =

Italian painter and engraver

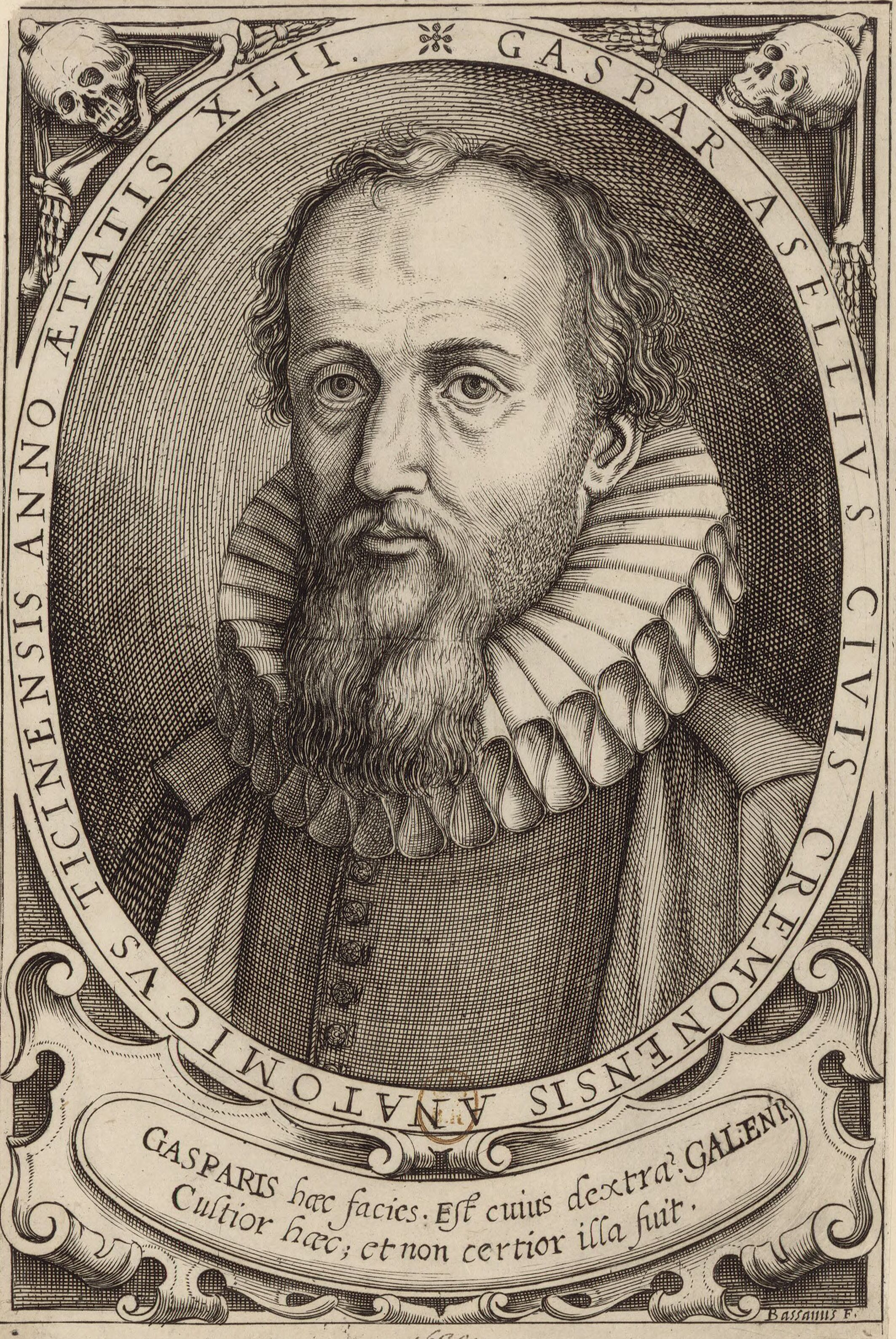
- Engraved portrait of Gaspar Assellius by Bassano
- Born: 1584; Milan, Duchy of Milan
- Died: 1648 (aged 63–64); Milan, Duchy of Milan
- Known for: Painter and copper engraver
- Movement: Baroque

Cesare Bassano (1584–1648) was an Italian painter and engraver of the Baroque period.

== Biography ==
Cesare Bassano was born in Milan in 1584 and worked as a copperplate engraver and woodcutter in his native city from 1603 to 1646. Little is known about his life, and there is no record of him working as a painter. He created engravings based on his own designs, as well as those of contemporary painters, particularly from the Lombard School – such as Giovanni Battista Crespi and the Procaccini family – whose compositional styles he adopted. Bassano actively contributed to the flourishing printing industry of early Baroque Italy. He specialized in executing lavish title pages and frontispieces for contemporary literary, theatrical, and scientific publications, most notably:

- Domenico Meschini, Narrazione delle solenni esequie del m.to ill.re sig. Francesco Piccolomini (Siena, 1608);
- Giambattista Andreini, Adamo (Milan, 1613; including 42 scenes based on designs by Carlo Antonio Procaccini, reprinted in 1617 with a new title page);
- Ottavio Rossi, Memorie Bresciane (Brescia, 1616; title page and 70 engravings);
- Agostino Mascardi, Orationi (Genoa, 1622);
- Gaspare Aselli, De lactibus sive lacteis venis (Milan, 1627; the polychrome anatomical plates, which appear in this edition of Aselli's work, have been attributed to either Bassano or to his associate Domenico Falcini);
- Cristoforo Giarda, Icones Symbolicae (Milan, 1628; title page and 16 plates);
- Tristano Calco, Historiae Patriae (Milan, 1628; frontispiece based on designs by Giovanni Battista Crespi);
- Erycius Puteanus, Historiae Cisalpinae (Milan, 1629);
- Giorgio Merula, Antiquitatis Vicecomitum Libri X (Milan, 1629–1630; frontispiece based on a design by Giovanni Battista Crespi; also used for Duodecim Vicecomitum Mediolani Principum Vitae by Paolo Giovio, containing 12 portraits, and for Vita Philippi Mariae by Pietro Candido Decembrio);
- Federico Borromeo, Sacri ragionamenti (Milan, 1632; frontispiece based on a design by Carlo Biffi);
- Leggi delle compere di S. Giorgio (Genoa, 1634; frontispiece based on a drawing by Domenico Fiasella);
- Giuseppe Ripamonti, Historiae Patriae (Milan, 1641–1648; 5 frontispieces based on designs by Johann Christoph Storer, Ottavio Salvioni, Melchiorre Gherardini, and Carlo Antonio Rossi, along with portraits of Ripamonti and Philip II);
- Giuseppe Ripamonti, De peste (Milan, 1641; frontispiece based on a design by Ottavio Salvioni).

The most notable of Bassano's individual engravings are: Christ at the Column (based on a design by Giulio Cesare Bedeschini, 1603); a group of plates dating from before 1614, published in Rome by Vaccari (Assumption of the Virgin; Madonna della Cerqua; Crucifixion; and The Twelve Apostles, based on designs by Raphael); 5 plates for the Sacrosanto Senato di Gesù (a series created in collaboration with Domenico Falcini and Luca Ciamberlano); Gasparo Aselli (1623); Mount Etna Erected in the Cathedral Square (designed by Richini, drawn by Carlo Biffi, 1630); Ottavio Piccolomini (designed by Francesco Lampugnani, 1635).

Map of the Siege of La Capelle by Bassano

Bassano also engraved headings of diplomas and graduate theses, commemorations of public events (feasts, marriages of powerful families, funerals) and maps. Notable examples of his maps and city plans include Disegno di Chiavenna (1622), Tavola... del giorno di Milano (1627), Pianta di Rocella (1628), Descrittione della Valtellina (1635), Disegno dell'assedio di Vercelli (1638), a four-sheet perspective view of Milan's monuments (based on a drawing by Lampugnani, 1640), and Descrittione and Disegno of the Castle of Tortona (1643).

== Gallery ==
Titlepage of Giuseppe Ripamonti's De peste, Milan, 1641

Titlepage of Giuseppe Ripamonti's Historiae Patriae, Milan, 1641

City plan of La Rochelle, Milan, 1628

Portrait of Giovan Battista Andreini

Map of Valtellina, 1622
