= San Carlo al Lazzaretto, Milan =

Church in Milan, Italy

Coordinates: 45.47724°N 9.20456°E

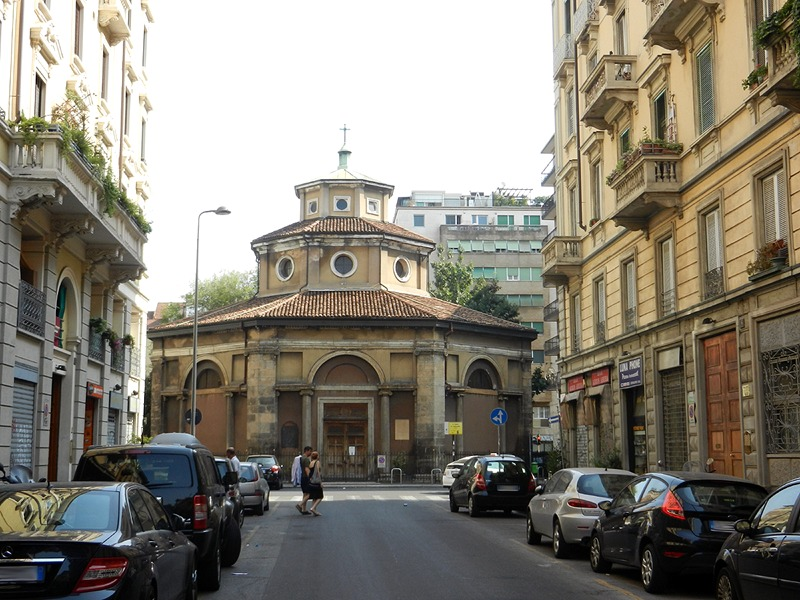
Present "Rear" of the church

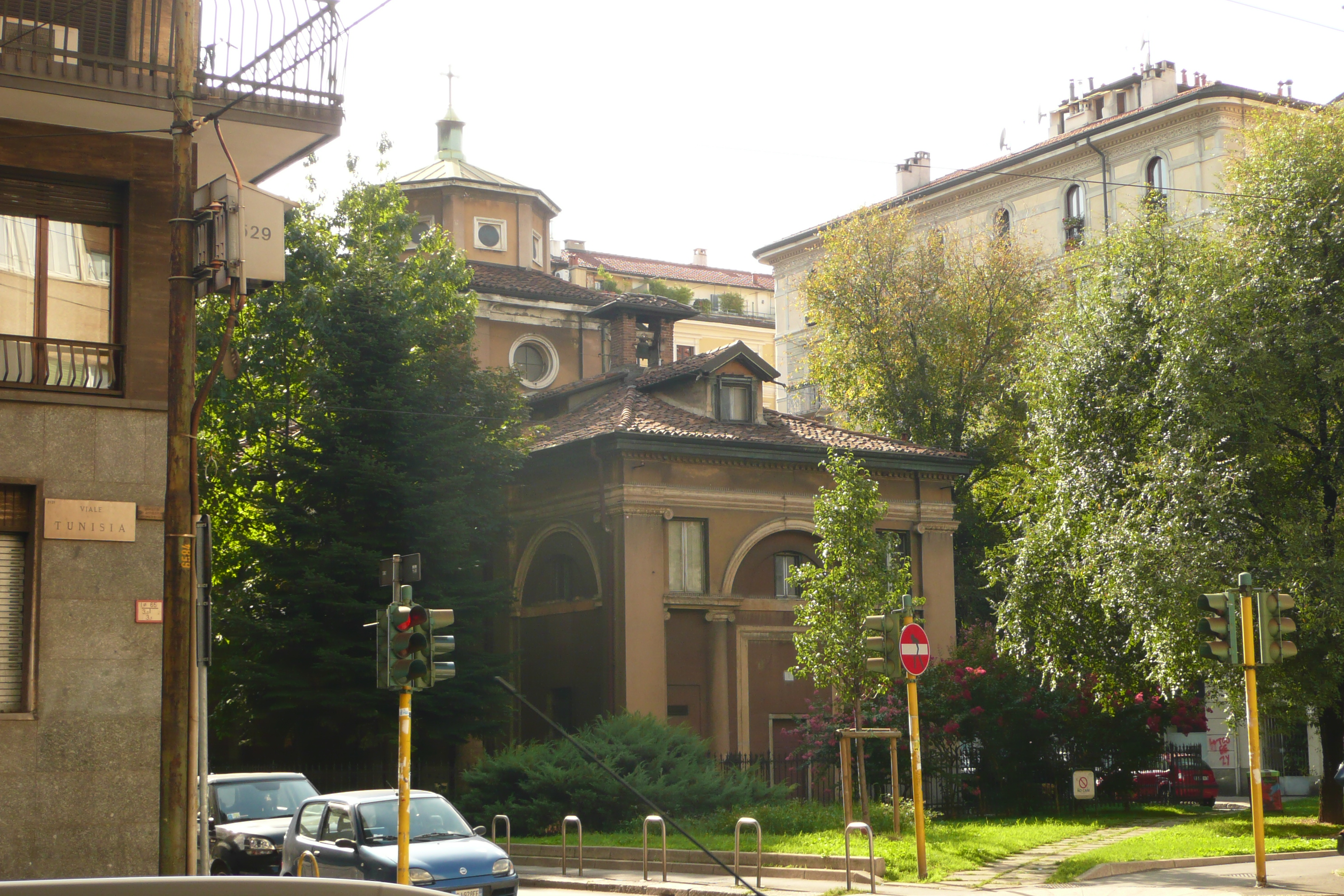
Facade with 19th-century portico

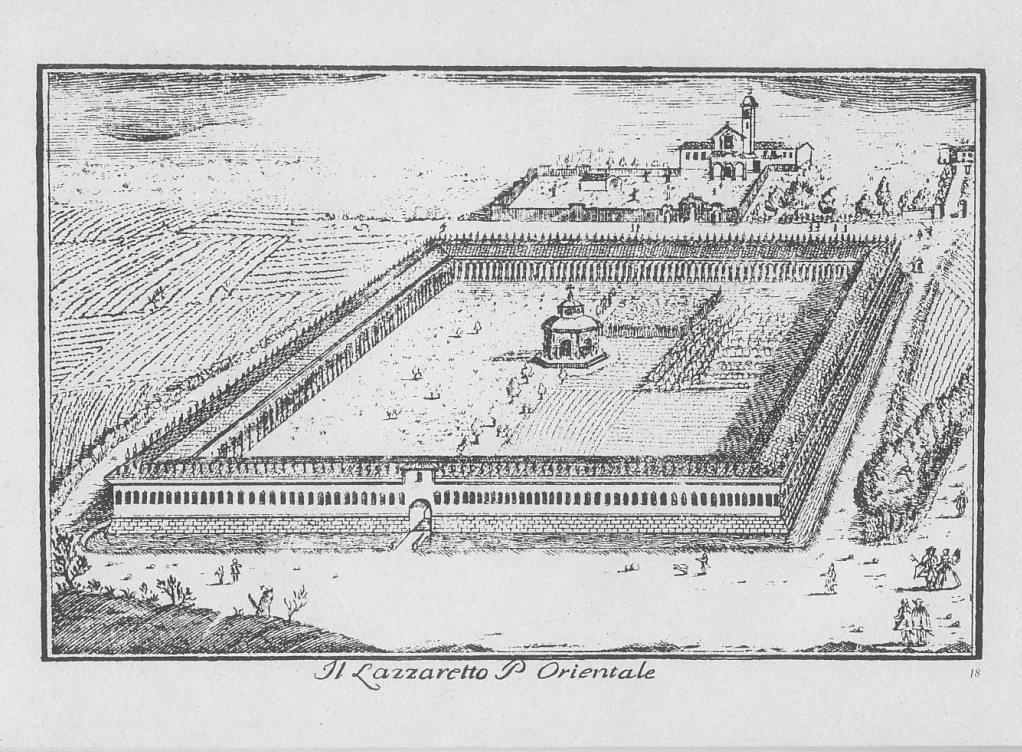
Aerial view of the Lazzaretto with the church of San Carlo in the center

San Carlo al Lazzaretto is a small Renaissance style octagonal church now in largo Bellintani Fra Paolo, number 1 in Milan, Lombardy, Italy. It is located about three blocks northwest of the gate known as Porta Venezia, which gave name to the quartiere. Its present situation, amidst crowded 19th and 20th century apartment blocks, has little relationship to its original placement, inside the central park of a massive rectangular cloister-like 15th-century leprosarium (Lazaretto). The church, once called Tempietto di Santa Maria della Sanità or San Carlino, escaped the late-nineteenth century demolition of the Lazzaretto.

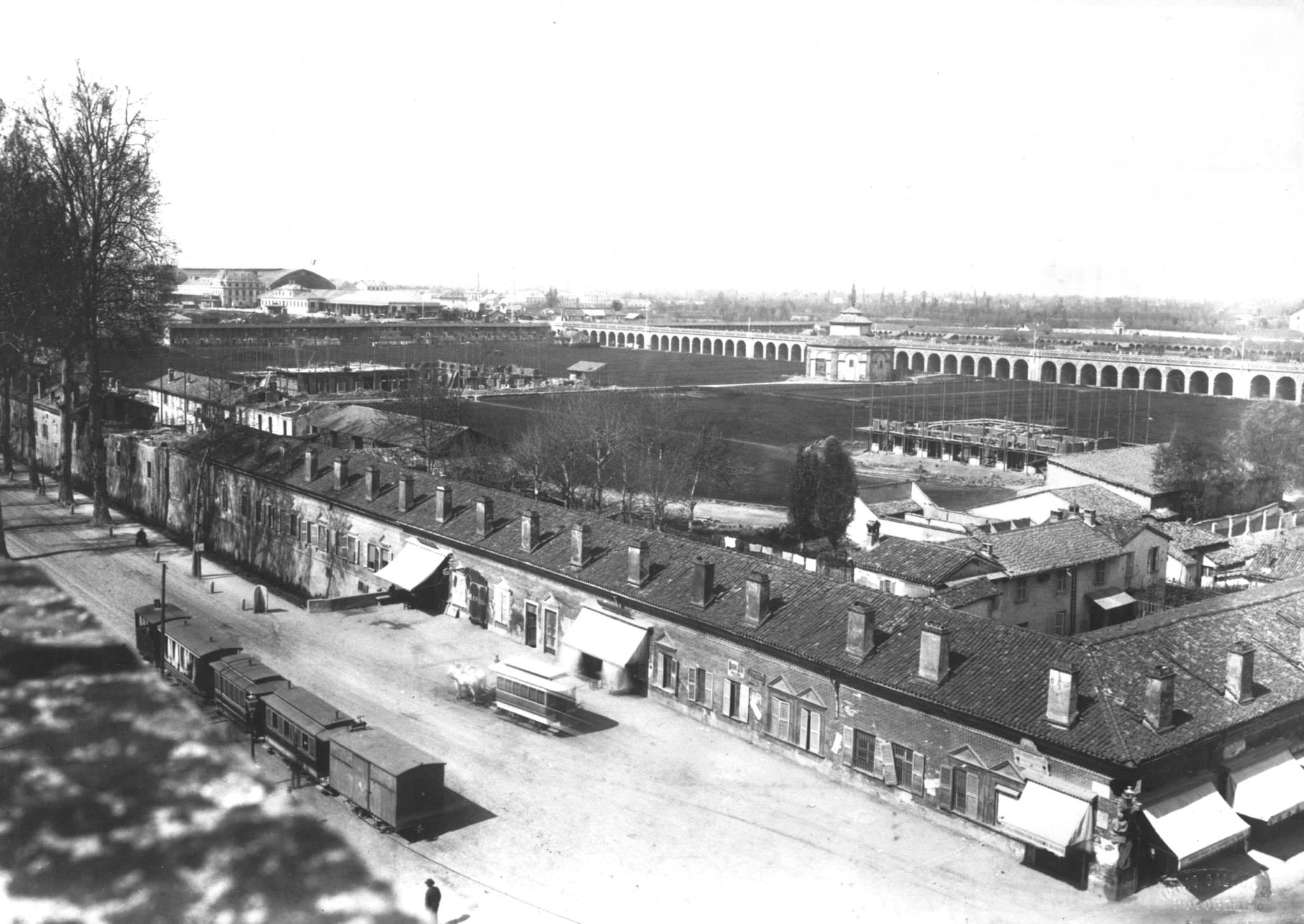
Lazzaretto in 1880, a few years before demolition

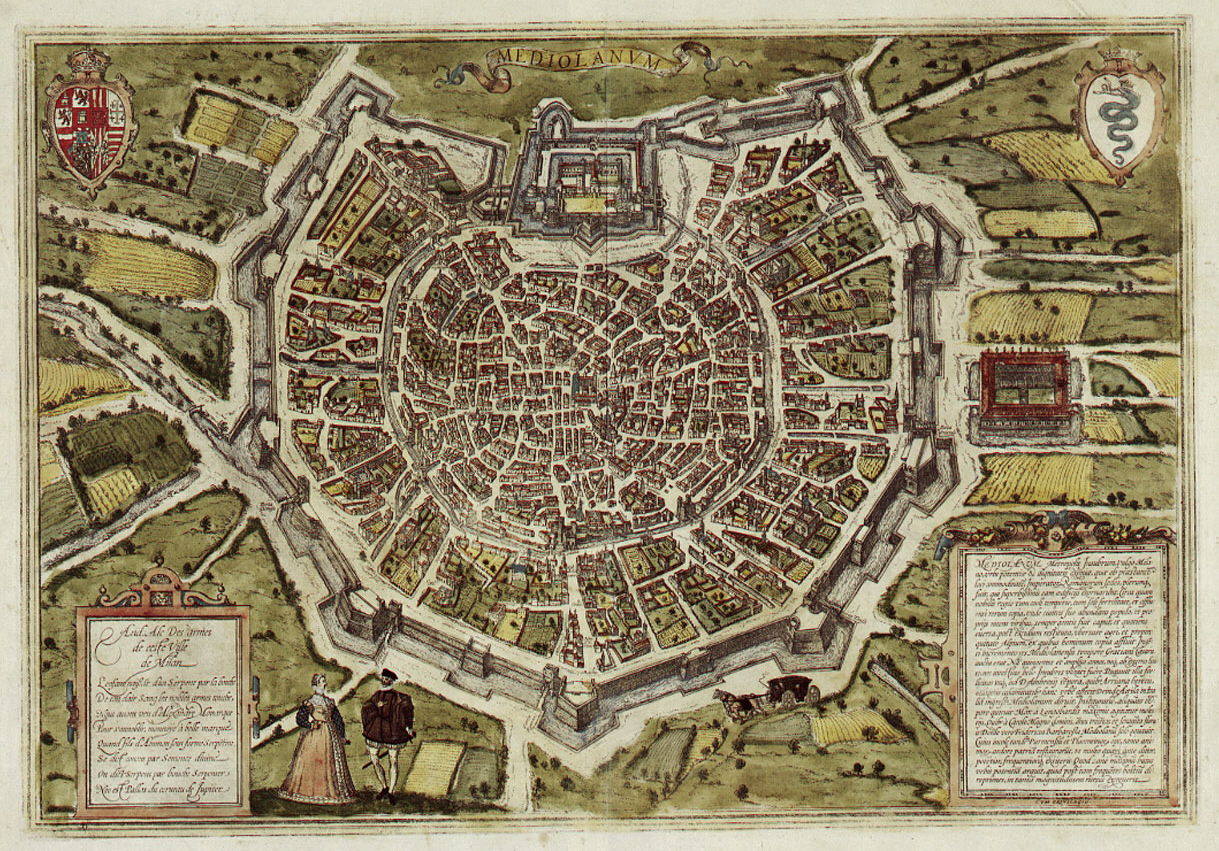
Map of Milan 1573, with rectangular Lazzaretto just outside the city walls on the right of the print

== History ==
The Lazzaretto of Milan was a quadrangle with 400 yard long sides, designed by Lazzaro Palazzi in the late 15th century. It was located outside the city walls and Porta Orientale. It encompassed an area now delimited by Via San Gregorio, Via Lazzaretto, Viale Vittorio Veneto, and Corso Buenos Aires: now spanning about twenty city blocks. In the center an altar had been placed in the open ground. After the Lazzaretto was used for housing the ill during the plague epidemic of 1576, the archbishop Carlo Borromeo commissioned a new church from Pellegrino Tibaldi. Construction from 1558 to 1592, erected this small centralized church with open circumferential arches which allowed the ill to see services from all corners of the surrounding porticos. After the French occupation of the Duchy, the lazzaretto was used as barracks. During the Cisalpine Republic, the architect Giuseppe Piermarini was commissioned to transform the church into a secular Tempio della Patria (Temple of the Nation). Piermarini demolished the cupola, and walled the sides, but reconstruction soon ceased. By the mid-19th century, the central fields of the Lazzaretto were used for small orchards, and the surrounding cloister was used by peasants and merchants. In 1881, the Lazaretto buildings were auctioned and within a year, nearly entirely demolished, and the church was reconsecrated by 1884, with a new dome and an added facade portico.

The church is the backdrop for a scene at the end of the Manzoni novel The Betrothed.

Because of the vibrations produced by the underground train under viale Tunisia which have damaged the dome the church has been subject to studies to reinforce its structure. After a failed fund raising for restoration among the public the church has been completely restored by a foundation in memory of Roberto Rocca. The goal was to use the church both for religious activities and as a concert hall. For this goal the rooms added at the end of 1800 for the sacristy and the priest house on the northern side have been transformed to host concert players. The altar has been moved towards the wall to have more space for concerts.

Work begun in September 2015 was completed in June 2017. The architectural design was by Studio 02 Arch, the static consolidation has been followed by Studio Associato Brambilla Ferrari and restoration was undertaken by Naos Restauri. A new organ has been installed with 1800 pipes, designed by Martino Lurani Cernuschi with a romantic-symphonic approach. The church was inaugurated by Milan archbishop Mario Delpini on 3 November 2017 at 8.30 pm. The church is open every day from 9 to 12 am, masses are organized Wednesday and Friday at 10 am.

The municipality has completed in 2016 a project to reserve to pedestrians Largo Bellintani around the church. The project is from arch. Loredana Brambilla of Milan Municipality.

== Bibliography ==
- Maria Teresa Fiorio, Le chiese di Milano, Milano: Electa, 2006
- G. Santi, Restauri nelle chiese della Diocesi di Milano, in "Terra Ambrosiana", n°5, pp. 33–49

== Gallery ==
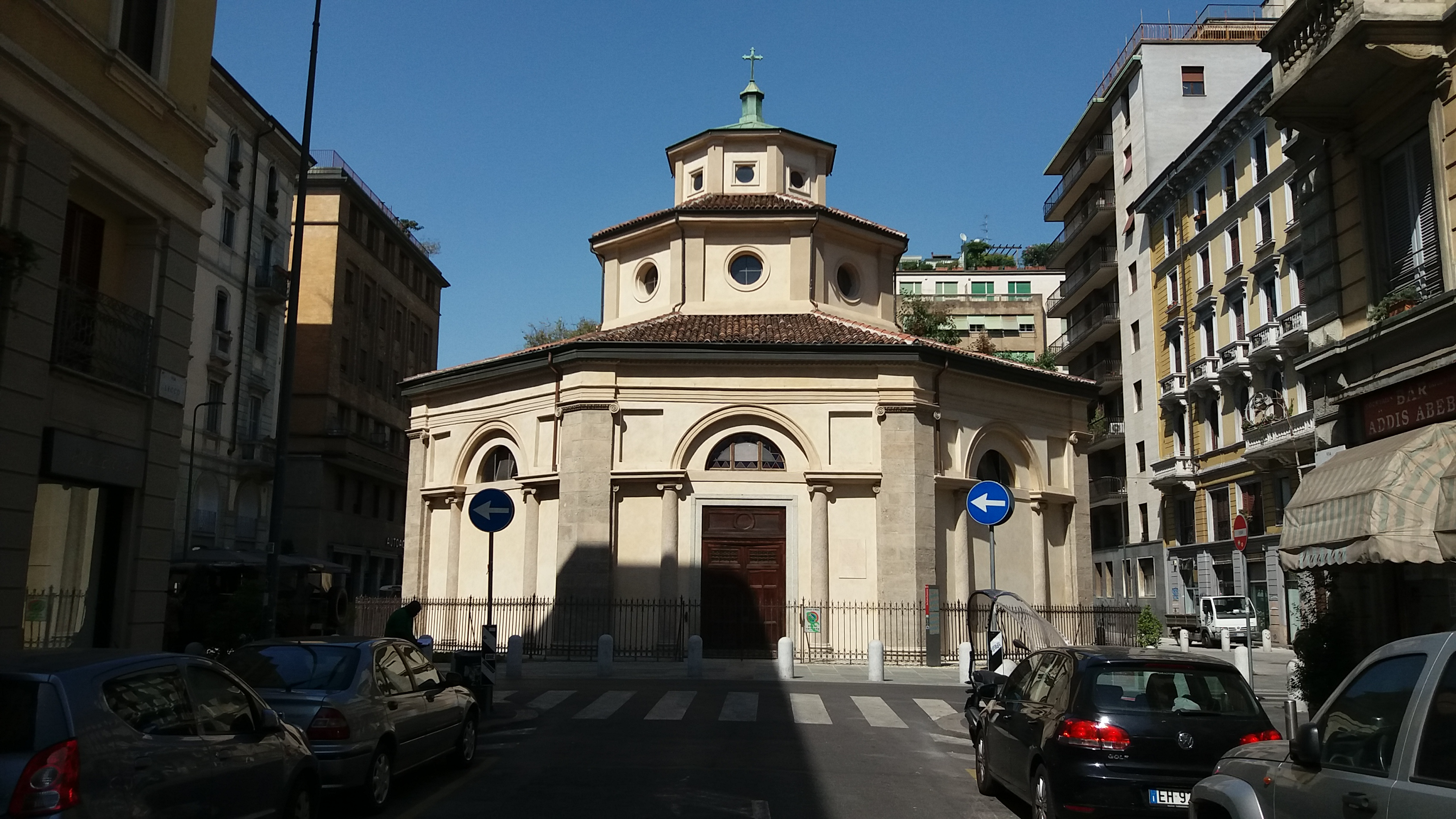
Facade towards via Lecco

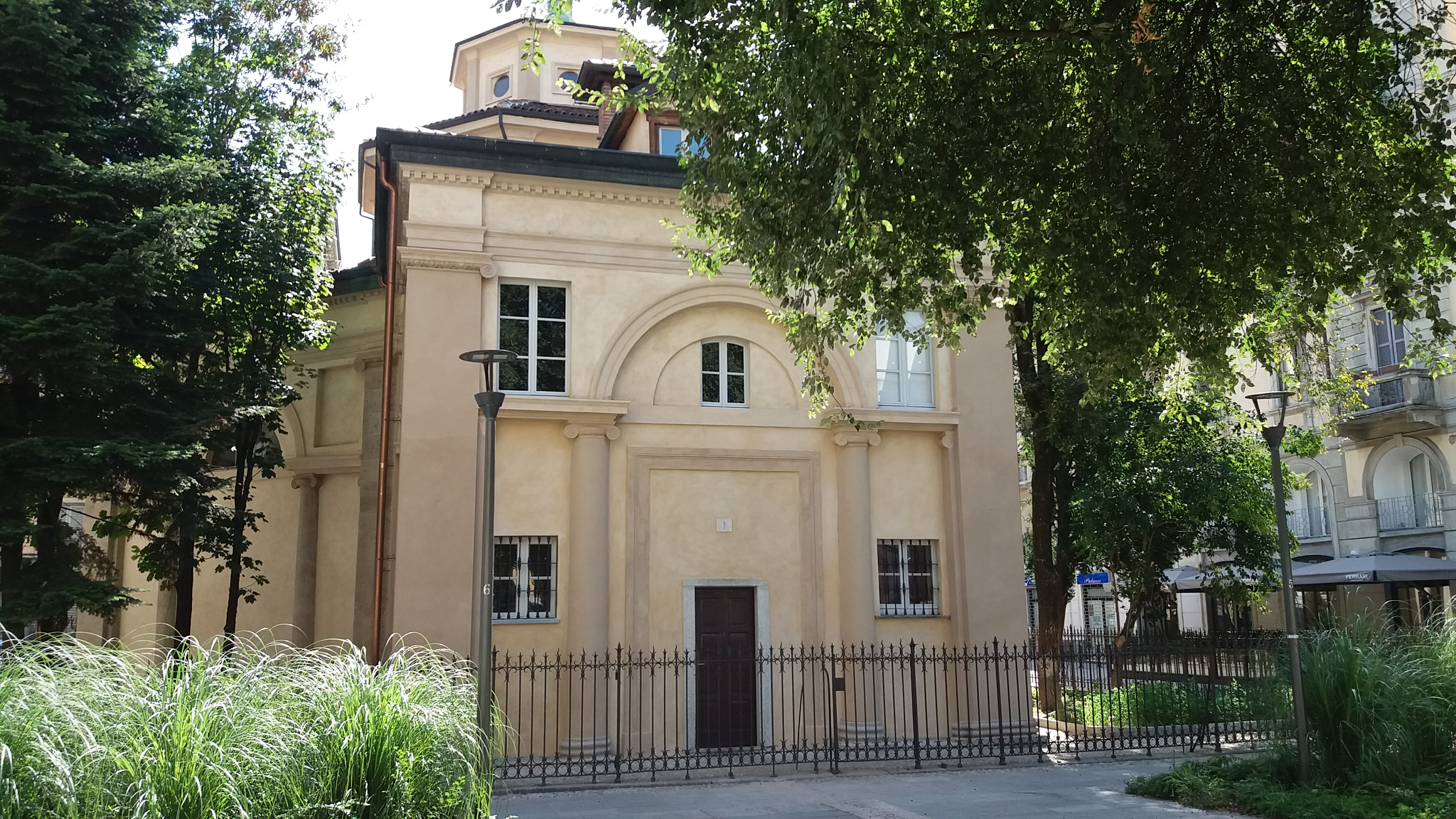
Facade towards largo Bellintani

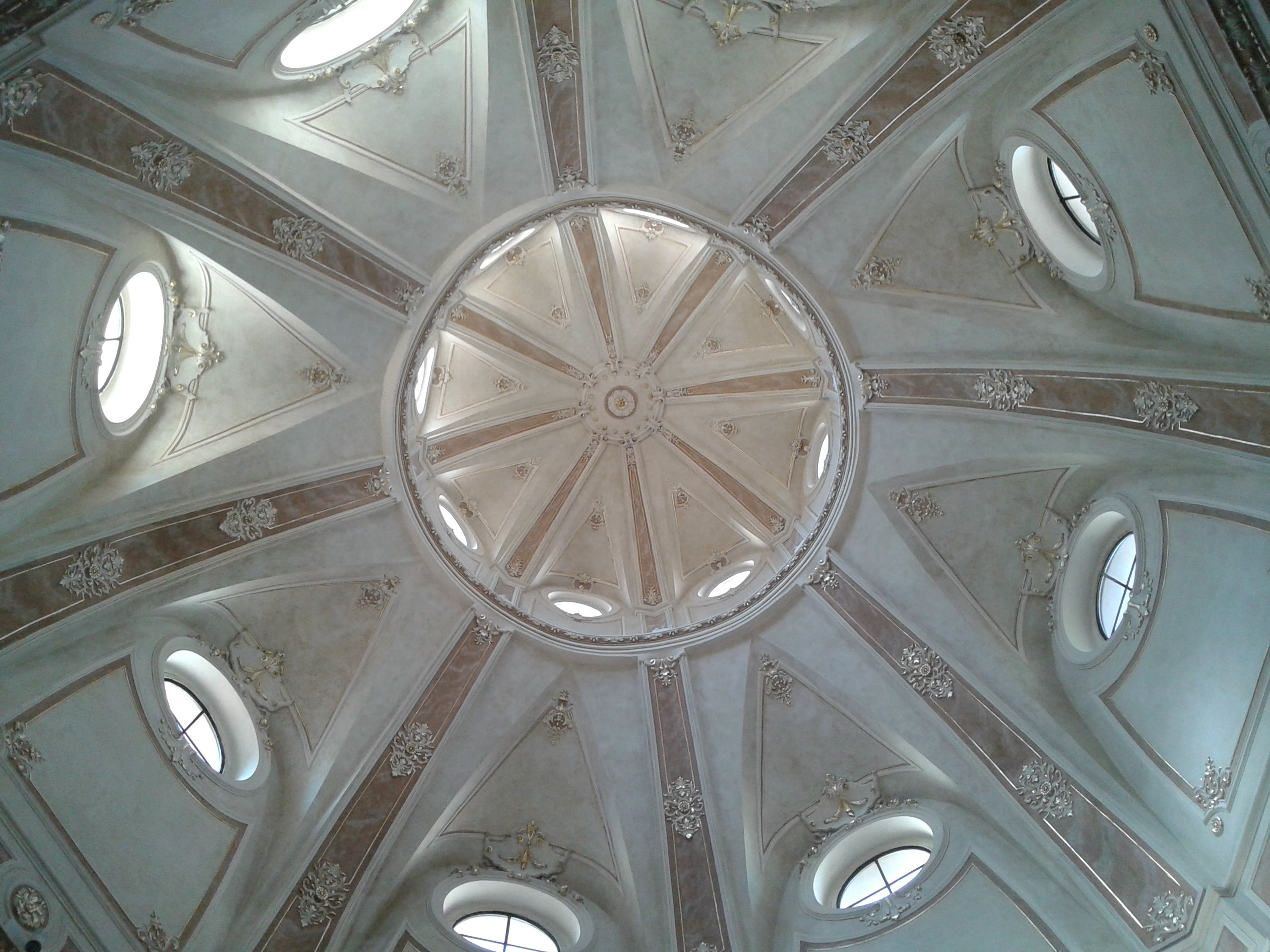
Dome
