= The Betrothed =

1827 Italian historical novel by Alessandro Manzoni

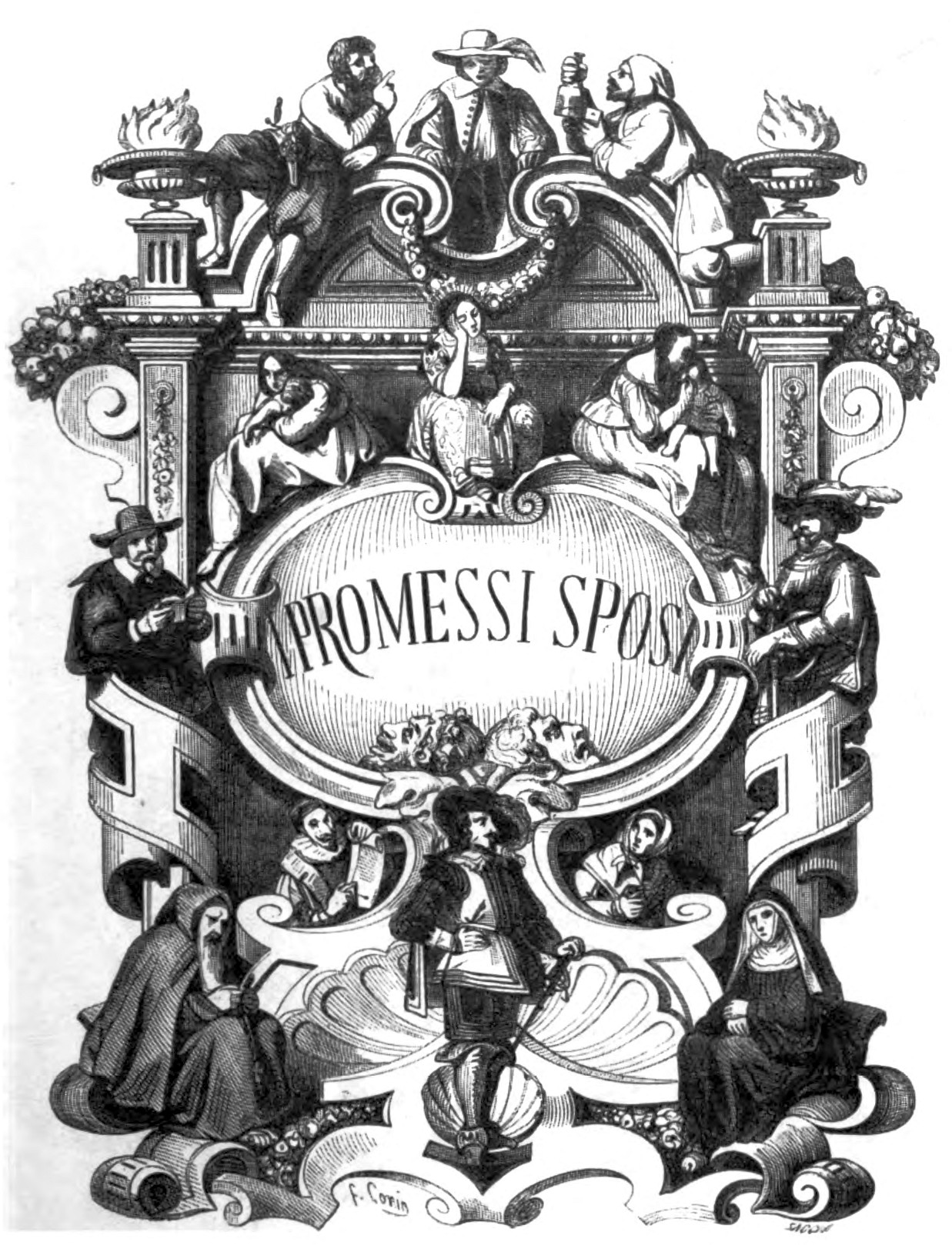
- Frontispiece of 1842 edition
- Author: Alessandro Manzoni
- Original title: I promessi sposi
- Translator: Charles Swan
- Language: Italian
- Genre: Historical novel
- Set in: Lombardy (chiefly Lecco, Milan and Monza), 1628–30
- Publisher: Vincenzo Ferrario (1st edition); Vincenzo Guglielmini and Giuseppe Redaelli (2nd revised edition)
- Publication date: 1825–1826 [i.e. 1827] (1st edition); 1840 [i.e. 1842] (2nd revised edition) (Title pages give wrong dates because of delays in publication); 1916 [i.e. 1823] (1st draft/3rd edition)
- Publication place: Milan
- English publication date: untranslated (1823 version); 1834 (1827 version); 1845 (1842 version)
- Dewey Decimal: 853.72
- LC Class: PQ4714.A2
- Original text: I promessi sposi at Italian Wikisource
- Translation: The Betrothed at Wikisource

The Betrothed (Italian: I promessi sposi, pronounced [i proˈmessi ˈspɔːzi]) is an Italian historical novel by Alessandro Manzoni. The novel was first published in three volumes between 1825 and 1827; it was significantly revised and rewritten until the definitive version was published between 1840 and 1842. It has been called the most famous and widely read novel in the Italian language.

Set in the Duchy of Milan in 1628 during the years of Spanish rule under the Spanish Habsburg, the novel is noted for its extraordinary description of the 1629–1631 Italian plague, particularly the one that struck Milan around 1630. Although it is a historical romance due its portrayal of the unwavering strength of love (the relationship between Renzo and Lucia, and their struggle to finally meet again and be married), it also deals with a variety of themes, such as the illusory nature of political power and the inherent injustice of any legal system and the range of character among the Christian clergy from the cowardice of the parish priest Don Abbondio to the heroic sanctity of others (the friar Padre Cristoforo and the cardinal Federico Borromeo).

== Writing and publication ==
Manzoni found the basis for his novel in late April 1821 when he read a 1627 Italian edict that specified penalties for any priest who refused to perform a marriage when requested to do so. More material for his story came from Giuseppe Ripamonti's Milanese Chronicles. The first version, Fermo e Lucia, was written between April 1821 and September 1823.

The first version was never published in his lifetime. He then heavily revised it, finishing in August 1825; it was published on 15 June 1827 after 22 months (1 year and 10 months) of corrections and proof-checking. Manzoni's chosen title, Gli sposi promessi, was changed for the sake of euphony shortly before its final commitment to printing. In the early 19th century, there was still controversy as to what form the standard literary language of Italy should take. Manzoni was firmly in favour of the dialect of Florence and, as he himself put it, after "washing his clothes in the Arno [the river passing through Florence]", he revised the novel's language for its republication in 1842, cleansing it of many Lombard regionalisms. The original name of one of the protagonists, Fermo, was changed for the same reason to Lorenzo.

Il Fermo e Lucia was finally published for the first time posthumously in 1916 as Gli sposi promessi, published for the first time in their entirety in the autograph by Giuseppe Lesca, Naples, Francesco Perrella, Società Anonima Editrice in 1916. It was published as Fermo e Lucia in Tutte le opere di Alessandro Manzoni, II, I Promessi sposi, II.3, Fermo e Lucia. Prima composizione del 1821-1823; Appendice storica su la colonna infame. Primo abbozzo del 1823, a cura di Alberto Chiari e Fausto Ghisalberti, Milano, Mondadori in 1954. It was edited by Mario Martelli in Florence, Sansoni Editore, (1988 [1973]).

== Synopsis ==
=== Chapters 1–8: Flight from the village ===
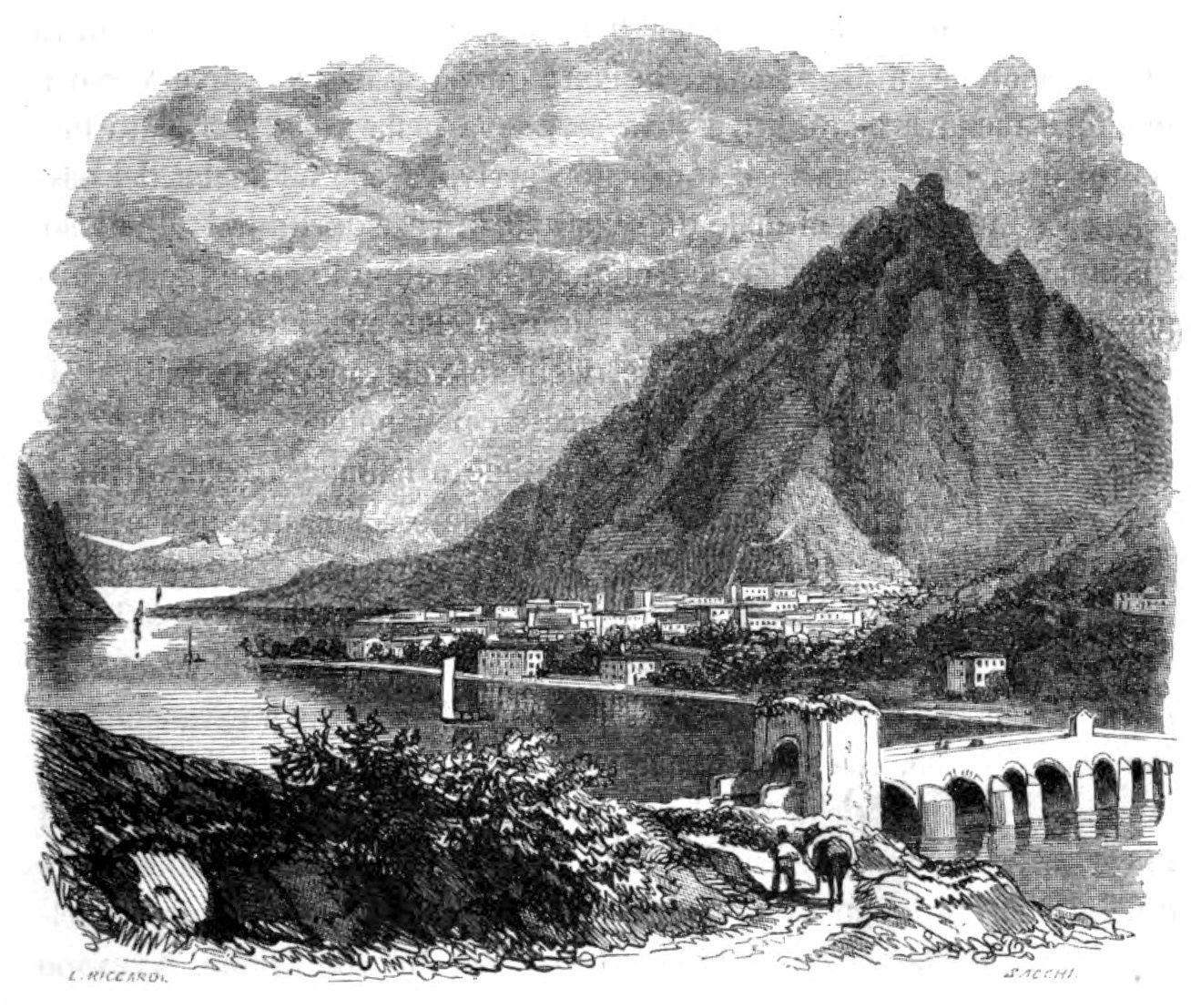
"That branch of the Lake of Como", chapter 1, illustrated by Luigi Riccardi

The setting is beautiful but marred with poverty. It begins with Renzo and Lucia, a couple living in a village in Lombardy, near Lecco, on Lake Como, who are planning to wed on 8 November 1628. The parish priest, don Abbondio, is walking home on the eve of the wedding when he is accosted by two "bravi" (thugs) who warn him not to perform the marriage, because the local baron, Don Rodrigo has forbidden it.

When he presents himself for the wedding ceremony, Renzo is amazed to hear that the marriage is to be postponed (the priest didn't have the courage to tell the truth). An argument ensues and Renzo succeeds in extracting from the priest the name of Don Rodrigo. It turns out that Don Rodrigo has his eye on Lucia and that he had a bet about her with his cousin Count Attilio.

Lucia's mother, Agnese, advises Renzo to ask the advice of "Dr. Azzeccagarbugli" (Dr. Quibbleweaver, in Colquhoun's translation), a lawyer in the town of Lecco. Dr. Azzeccagarbugli is at first sympathetic: thinking Renzo is actually the perpetrator, he shows Renzo a recent edict criminalising the making of threats to procure or prevent marriages, but when he hears the name of Don Rodrigo, he panics and drives Renzo away. Lucia sends a message to "Fra Cristoforo" (Friar Christopher), a respected Capuchin friar at the monastery of Pescarenico, asking him to come as soon as he can.

Fra Christopher's back story is told. He used to be the son of a rich merchant and his birth name was Lodovico. He had a steward named Christopher, who was very faithful and had a family. While traveling along a road, Lodovico and his enemy had a standoff over who would lose face and pass on the outside. A fight broke out and an enemy bravo killed Christopher. Lodovico then killed Christopher's murderer. Lodovico then decided to become a friar after wrapping up his worldly affairs with Christopher's family and the family of the man he had killed. Lodovico became a friar, taking the name Fra Christopher.

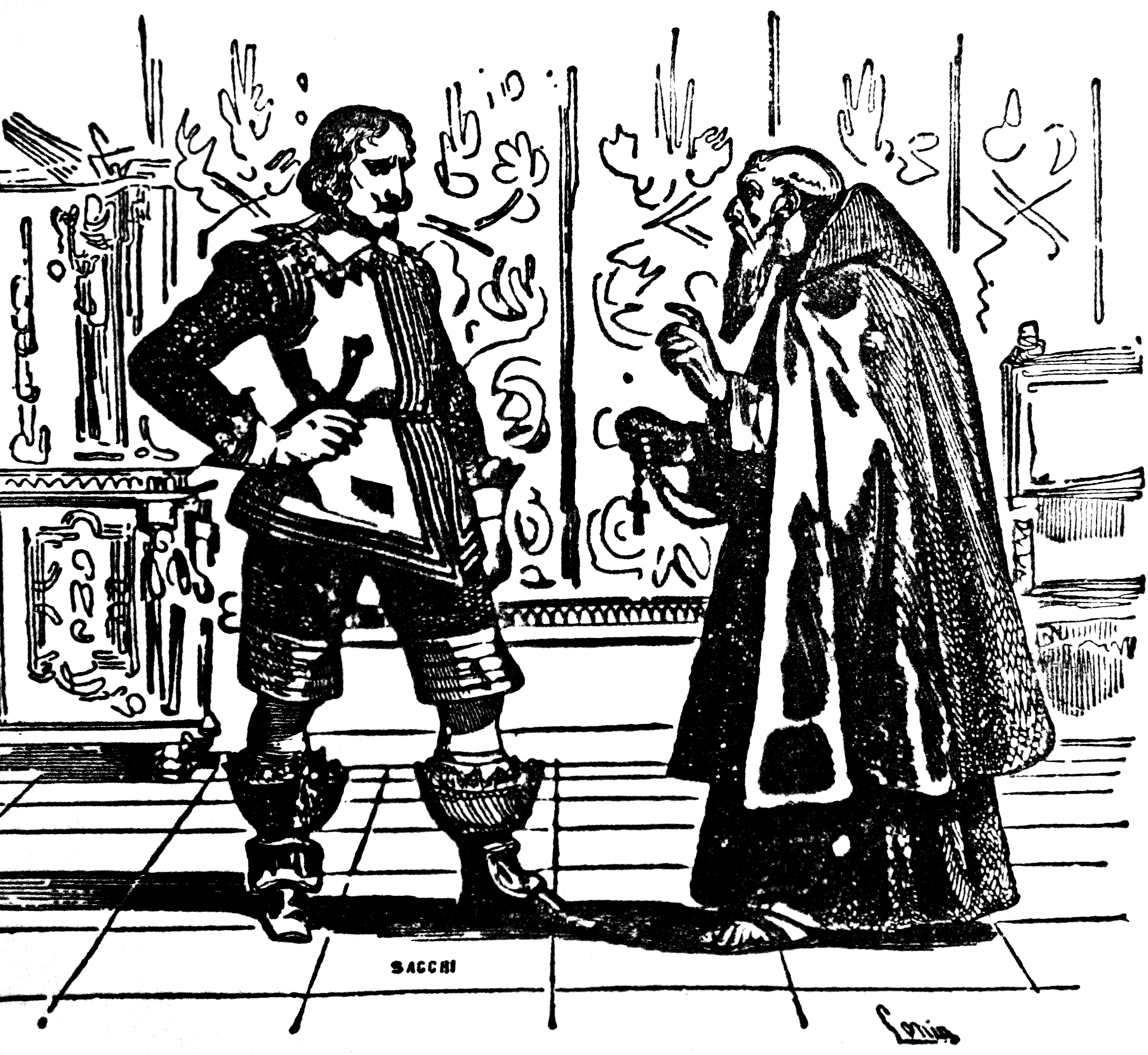
Fra Cristoforo and Don Rodrigo

When Fra Cristoforo comes to Lucia's cottage and hears the story, he immediately goes to Don Rodrigo's mansion, where he finds the baron at a meal with his cousin Count Attilio, along with four guests, including the mayor and Dr. Azzeccagarbugli. The power dynamics of the people at the dining table is evident. When Don Rodrigo is taken aside by the friar, he explodes with anger at his presumption and sends him away, but not before an old servant has a chance to offer his help to Cristoforo.

Meanwhile, Agnese has come up with a plan. In those days, it was possible for two people to marry by declaring themselves married before a priest and in the presence of two amenable witnesses. Renzo runs to his friend Tonio and offers him 25 lire if he agrees to help. When Fra Cristoforo returns with the bad news, Lucia and Renzo argue about how to proceed. Lucia is a God-fearing woman and doesn't want to get married by law. Renzo doesn't care and wants to get married no matter what and acts harshly to Lucia. Eventually, they decide to put their plan into action.

The next morning, Lucia and Agnese are visited by beggars, Don Rodrigo's men in disguise. They examine the house in order to plan an assault. Late at night, Agnese distracts Don Abbondio's servant Perpetua while Tonio and his brother Gervaso enter Don Abbondio's study, ostensibly to pay a debt. They are followed indoors secretly by Lucia and Renzo. When they try to carry out their plan, the priest throws the tablecloth in Lucia's face and drops the lamp. They struggle in the darkness. The plan fails and the five flee.

In the meantime, Don Rodrigo's men invade Lucia's house, but nobody is there. A boy named Menico, friend of Lucia and Renzo, arrives with a message of warning from Fra Cristoforo and they seize him. When they hear the alarm being raised by the sacristan, who is calling for help on the part of Don Abbondio who raised the alarm of invaders in his home, they assume they have been betrayed and flee in confusion. Menico sees Agnese, Lucia and Renzo in the street and warns them not to return home. They go to the monastery, where Fra Cristoforo gives Renzo a letter of introduction to a certain friar at Milan, and another letter to the two women, to organize a refuge at a convent in the nearby city of Monza.

=== Chapters 9–10: The Nun of Monza ===
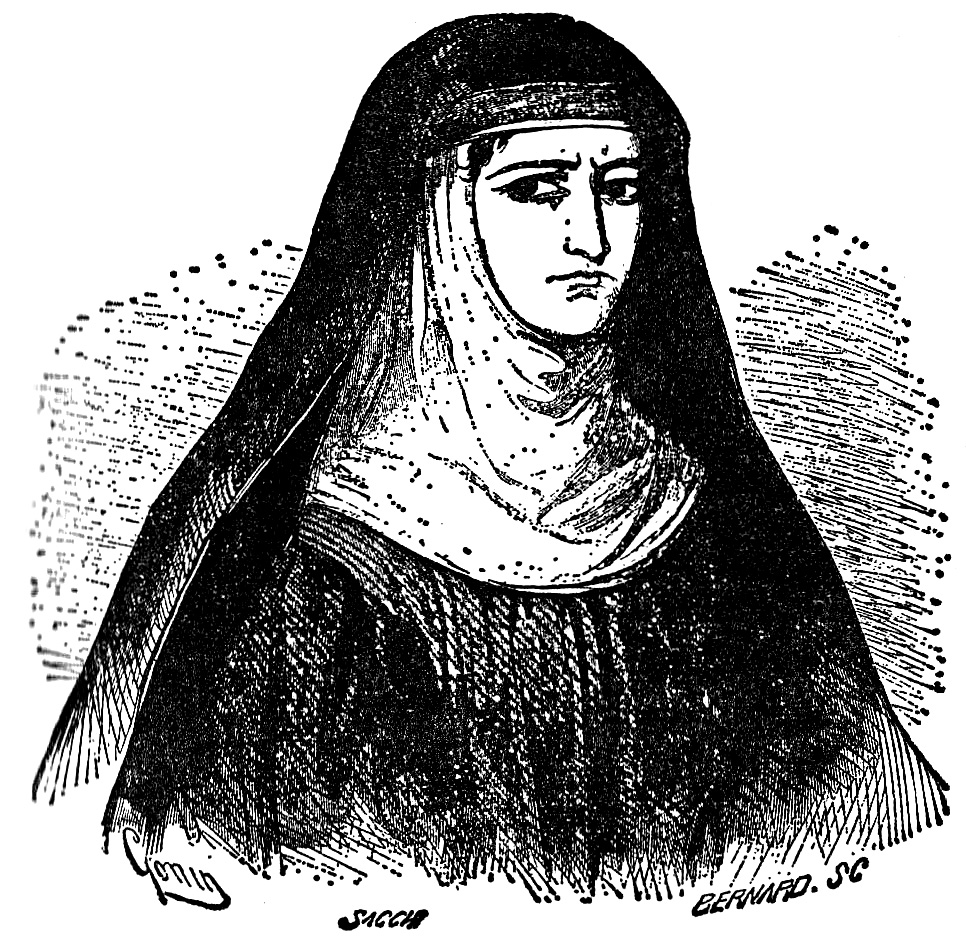
The Nun of Monza

They lament leaving Lecco. Renzo, Lucia, and Agnese part ways. Lucia is entrusted to the nun Gertrude, a strange and unpredictable noblewoman whose story is told in these chapters. A child of the most important family of the area, her father decided to send her to the cloisters for no other reason than to simplify his affairs: he wished to keep his properties united for his first-born, heir to the family's title and riches. Growing up to be a nun she thought she was more superior than others. As she grew up, she sensed that she was being forced by her parents into a life which would comport but little with her personality. She was kept in a convent for most of her life and dreamed to escape.

To become a nun, Gertrude must go back to the outside world and reflect if she wants to leave it forever. She is excited until she finds that her own family locks her up inside and ignores her. She finds solace in an affair with a servant boy. When her father finds out, he is furious and threatens and manipulates her into agreeing to become a nun permanently. The fear of scandal, as well as manoeuvre, menaces, and manipulation from her father, induced Gertrude to lie to her interviewers in order to enter the convent of Monza, where she was received as la Signora. This forms Gertrude's personality and mental state badly as her hate of being a nun seeps into her actions. ("the lady", also known as The Nun of Monza). Later, she fell under the spell of a young man of no scruples, Egidio, associated with the worst baron of that time, the Innominato (the "Unnamed"). Egidio and Gertrude became lovers. When another nun discovered their relationship they killed her and buried her near the garden wall.

=== Chapters 11–17: Renzo in Milan ===
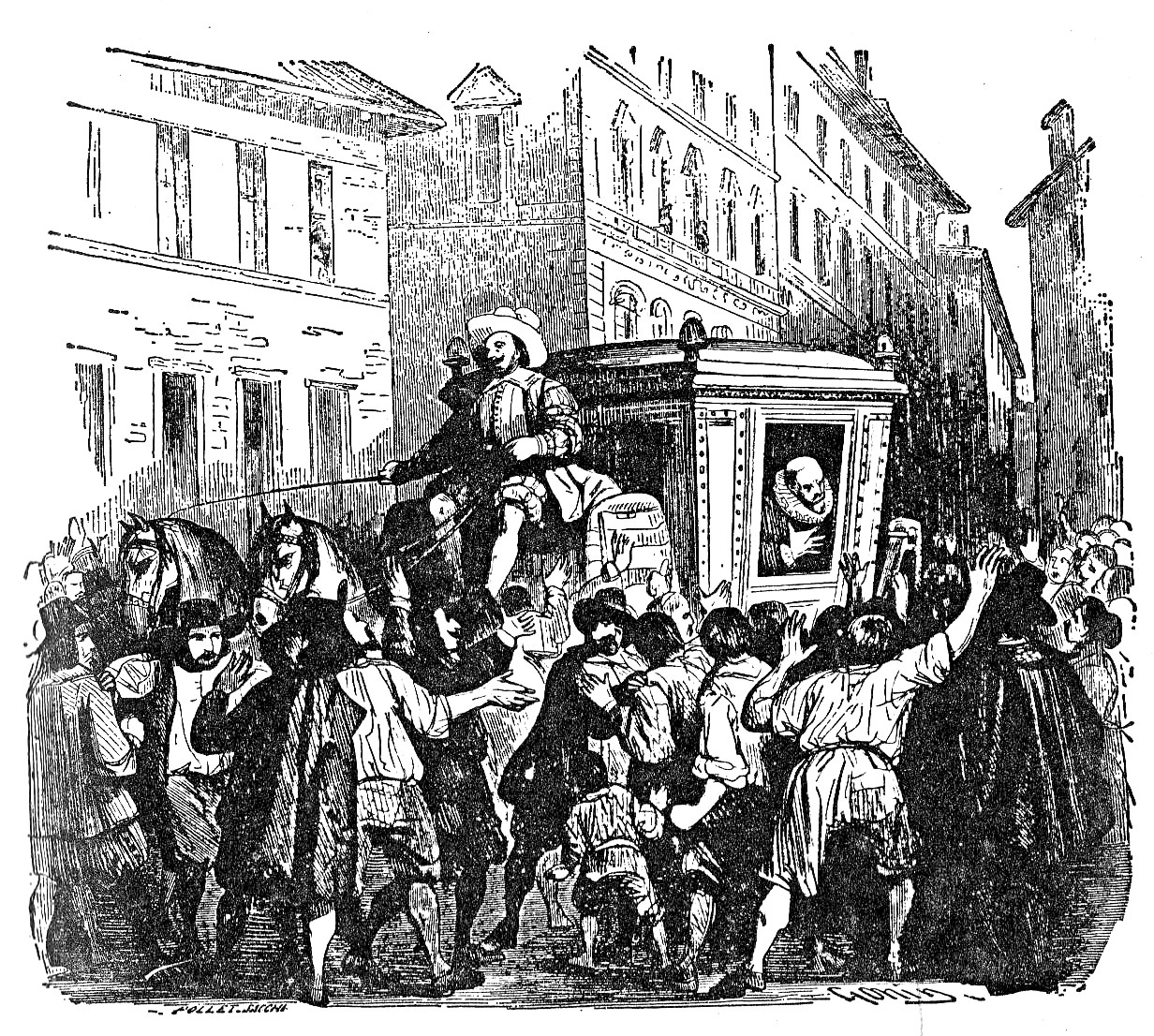
The Grand Chancellor Ferrer from chapter 13

Renzo arrives in famine-stricken Milan and goes to the monastery, but the friar he is seeking is absent and so he wanders further into the city. A bakery in the Corsia de' Servi, El prestin di scansc ("Bakery of the Crutches"), is destroyed by a mob, who then go to the house of the Commissioner of Supply in order to lynch him. He is saved in the nick of time by Ferrer, the Grand Chancellor, who arrives in a coach and announces he is taking the Commissioner to prison. Renzo becomes prominent as he helps Ferrer make his way through the crowd.

After witnessing these scenes, Renzo joins in a lively discussion and reveals views which attract the notice of a police agent in search of a scapegoat. The agent tries to lead Renzo directly to "the best inn" (i.e. prison) but Renzo is tired and stops at one nearby where, after being plied with drink, he reveals his full name and address. The next morning, he is awakened by a notary and two bailiffs, who handcuff him and start to take him away. In the street Renzo announces loudly that he is being punished for his heroism the day before and, with the aid of sympathetic onlookers and political unrest brewing, he escapes. Leaving the city by the same gate through which he entered, he sets off for Bergamo, knowing that his cousin Bortolo lives in a village nearby. Once there, he will be beyond the reach of the authorities of Milan (under Spanish domination), as Bergamo is territory of the Most Serene Republic of Venice.

At an inn in Gorgonzola, he overhears a conversation which makes it clear to him how much trouble he is in and so he walks all night until he reaches the River Adda. After a short sleep in a hut, he crosses the river at dawn in the boat of a fisherman and makes his way to his cousin's house, where he is welcomed as a silk-weaver under the pseudonym of Antonio Rivolta after he confesses everything to Bortolo. The same day, orders for Renzo's arrest reach the town of Lecco, to the delight of Don Rodrigo.

=== Chapters 18–24: Lucia and the Unnamed ===
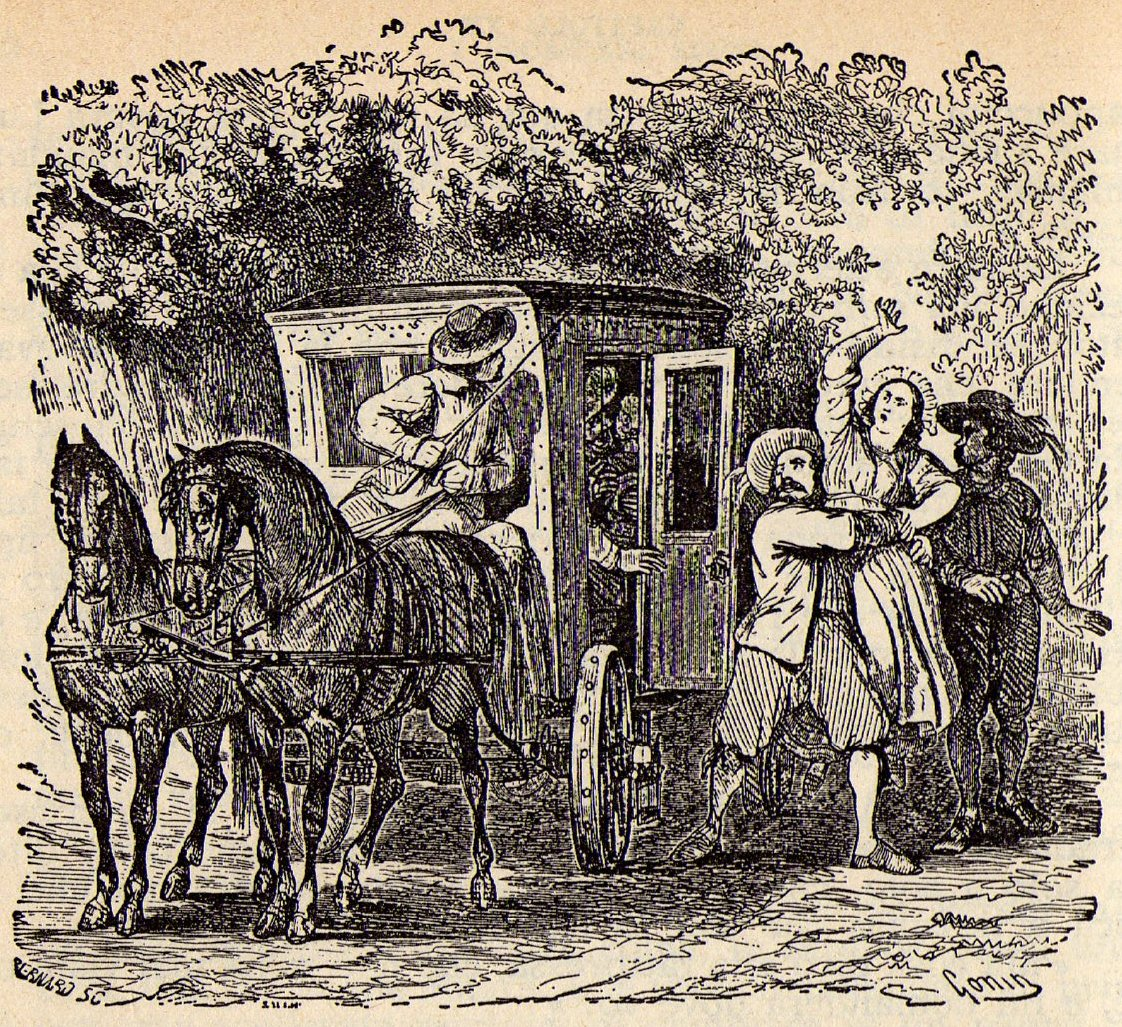
Lucia is kidnapped from the convent

News of Renzo's disgrace comes to the convent, but later Lucia is informed that Renzo is safe with his cousin. Their reassurance is short-lived: when they receive no word from Fra Cristoforo for a long time, Agnese travels to Pescarenico, where she learns that he has been ordered by a superior to the town of Rimini. In fact, this has been engineered by Don Rodrigo and Count Attilio, who have leaned on a mutual uncle of the Secret Council, who has leaned on the Father Provincial. Meanwhile, Don Rodrigo has organised a plot to kidnap Lucia from the convent. This involves a great robber baron whose name has not been recorded, and who hence is called l'Innominato, the Unnamed.

Gertrude, blackmailed by Egidio, a neighbor (acquaintance of l'Innominato and Gertrude's lover), persuades Lucia to run an errand which will take her outside the convent for a short while. In the street Lucia is seized and bundled into a coach. After a nightmarish journey, Lucia arrives at the castle of the Unnamed, where she is locked in a chamber.

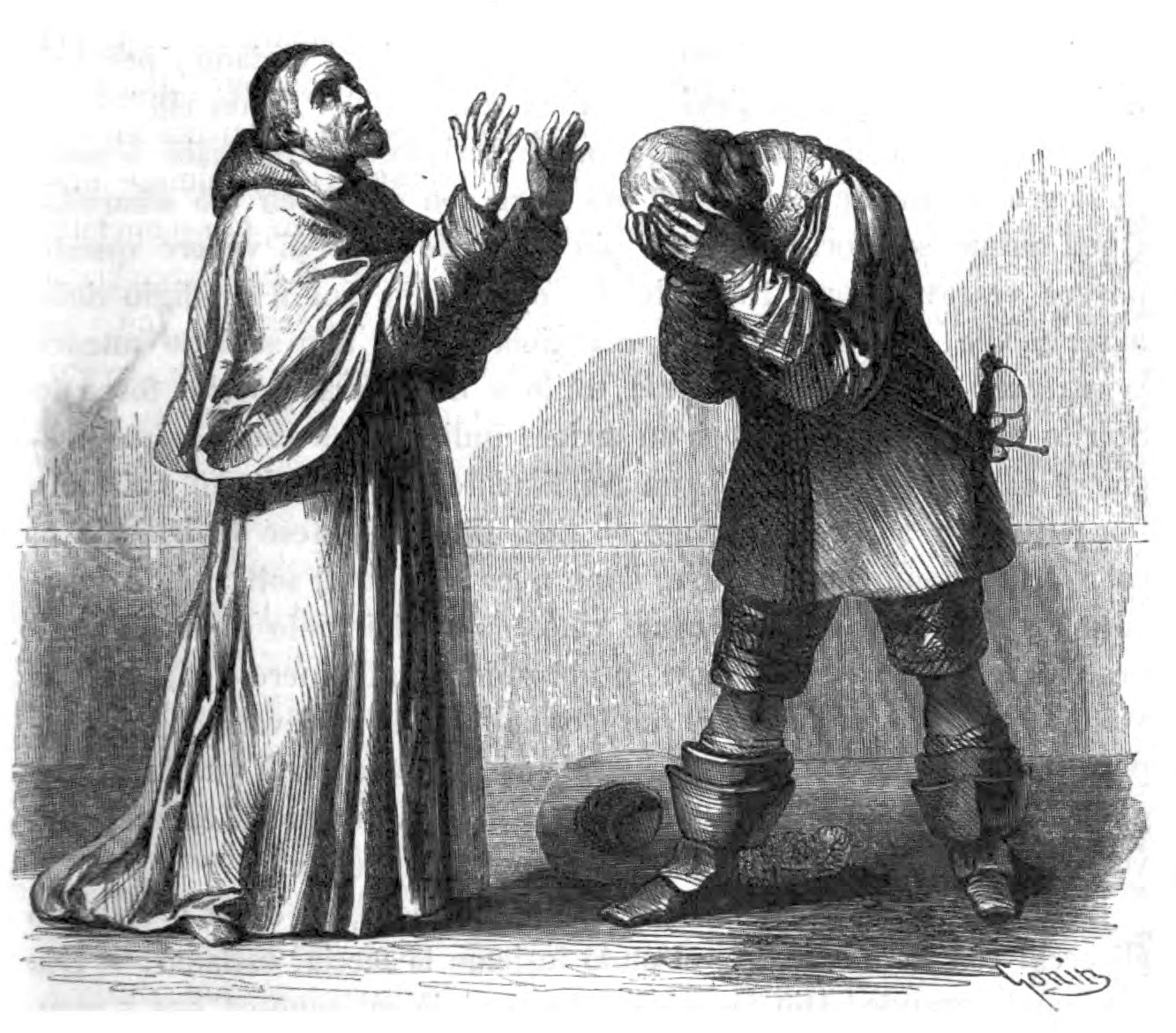
The Unnamed with Cardinal Borromeo

The Unnamed is troubled by the sight of her, and spends a horrible night in which memories of his past and the uncertainty of his future almost drive him to suicide. Meanwhile, Lucia spends a similarly restless night, during which she vows to renounce Renzo and maintain perpetual virginity if she is delivered from her predicament. Towards the morning, on looking out of his window, the Unnamed sees throngs of people walking past. They are going to listen to the famous Archbishop of Milan, Cardinal Federigo Borromeo. On impulse, the Unnamed leaves his castle in order to meet this man. This meeting prompts a miraculous conversion which marks the turning-point of the novel. The Unnamed announces to his men that his reign of terror is over. He decides to take Lucia back to her native land under his own protection, and with the help of the archbishop the deed is done.

=== Chapters 25–27: Fall of Don Rodrigo ===
The astonishing course of events leads to an atmosphere in which Don Rodrigo can be defied openly and his fortunes take a turn for the worse. Don Abbondio is reprimanded by the archbishop. Lucia, miserable about her vow to renounce Renzo, still frets about him. He is now the subject of diplomatic conflict between Milan and Bergamo. Her life is not improved when a wealthy busybody, Donna Prassede, insists on taking her into her household and admonishing her for getting mixed up with a good-for-nothing like Renzo. Donna Prassede tries to warp Lucia's mindset of Renzo by making him seem evil. Renzo and Agnes institute a correspondence using trustworthy literate people to write and read from them. A few letters in, Agnes does what she had promised Lucia and gives Renzo 50 crowns and tells him about Lucia's vow to not marry him. Renzo is enraged and refuses to accept both. He wants to return the crowns and ask Lucia why she made that vow.

=== Chapters 28–30: Famine and war ===
The government of Milan is unable to keep bread prices down by decree and the city is swamped by beggars. The lazzaretto is filled with the hungry and sick. Lazzarettos are sometimes churches or convents as in Chapter 30–33. Meanwhile, the Thirty Years' War brings more calamities. The last three dukes of the house of Gonzaga die without legitimate heirs sparking a war for control of northern Italy, with France and the Holy Roman Empire backing rival claimants. In September 1629, German armies under Count Rambaldo di Collalto descend on Italy, looting and destroying. Agnese, Don Abbondio and Perpetua take refuge in the well-defended territory of the Unnamed. In their absence, their village is wrecked by the mercenaries.

=== Chapters 31–33: Plague ===
These chapters are occupied with an account of the plague of 1630, largely based on Giuseppe Ripamonti's De peste quae fuit anno 1630 (published in 1640). Manzoni's full version of this, Storia della Colonna Infame, was finished in 1829, but was not published until it was included as an appendix to the revised edition of 1842. The plague is not believed to actually be the plague by many, slow progress helps doubts arise in common people and even doctors. Most people in Italy think it has to do with Frenchmen enlisting witches to make poison from spiders. The spider poison is then spread around and that is how they believe the plague is spread.

As more people get sick, the capuchins help them in the Lazarettos. A memorable one is Fra Frederick. The Tribunal of Health in the government of Italy realize they need more people to help contain and manage the plague. Three classes are created under the Tribunal of Health. The 3rd class is the monatti who do the brunt work of carrying and deposing of the dead bodies, the 2nd apparittori are people who precede funerals, and the 1st class is the commissaries who oversee both of the lower two classes.

Another story/rumor is spread to back up the spider witch poison theory. The end of August 1630 sees the death in Milan of the original villains of the story. It happens like so, back in Don Rodrigo's place, he is joyful and makes fun of the so-called illness. Until, one night after a party he catches the plague. In his fright, trusts Grizo to go get a doctor for him. Grizo betrays him for Don Roderick's riches and turns him in to the monatti. Grizo is then hit by karma when his greed to check for money in Don Roderigo's clothes makes him fall ill too, and dies quickly.

Renzo, troubled by Agnese's letters and recovering from plague, finally decides to search out Lucia. He returns to his native village to find that many of the inhabitants are dead and that his house and vineyard have been destroyed. He also finds Tony there, sick and brain damaged. The people put money in a bowl of vinegar to clean it from the plague. There is a new way of life during the plague Renzo sees while traveling. Those who have survived the plague walk boldly while those who are healthy and have not, are fearful. Renzo also finds Don Abbondio and gets information on what has happened. Don Abbondio urges him to go back, Renzo refuses. The warrant, and Don Rodrigo, are forgotten. A childhood friend of Renzo's tells him that Lucia is in Milan. He travels to Milan.

=== Chapters 34–38: Conclusion ===
On his arrival in Milan, Renzo is astonished at the state of the city. In Milan, it is mostly deserted. People are very wary and sad. Renzo sees all the empty houses and a mourning mother. His highland clothes invite suspicion that he is an "anointer"; that is, a foreign agent deliberately spreading plague in some way. He learns that Lucia is now languishing at the Lazzaretto of Milan, along with 16,000 other victims of the plague. While trying to ask for directions he is accused of having the spider poison. In the paranoia, everyone in the city believes it. Renzo is then caught between the growing mob and the monatti. The monatti grab Renzo and save him.

In the monatti cart, Renzo is ill at ease. The monatti act like bullies and cheer to the never end of the plague. After riding for a bit, they reach the lazaretto. Renzo escapes the monatti and sees all the sick people. Chapter 33 ends with Renzo stepping over the threshold of the lazaretto hoping to find Lucia. In fact, Lucia is already recuperating. Renzo and Lucia are reunited by Fra Cristoforo, but only after Renzo first visits and forgives the dying Don Rodrigo. The friar absolves her of her vow of celibacy. Renzo walks through a rainstorm to see Agnese at the village of Pasturo. When they all return to their native village, Lucia and Renzo are finally married by Don Abbondio and the couple make a fresh start at a silk-mill at the gates of Bergamo.

== Characters ==
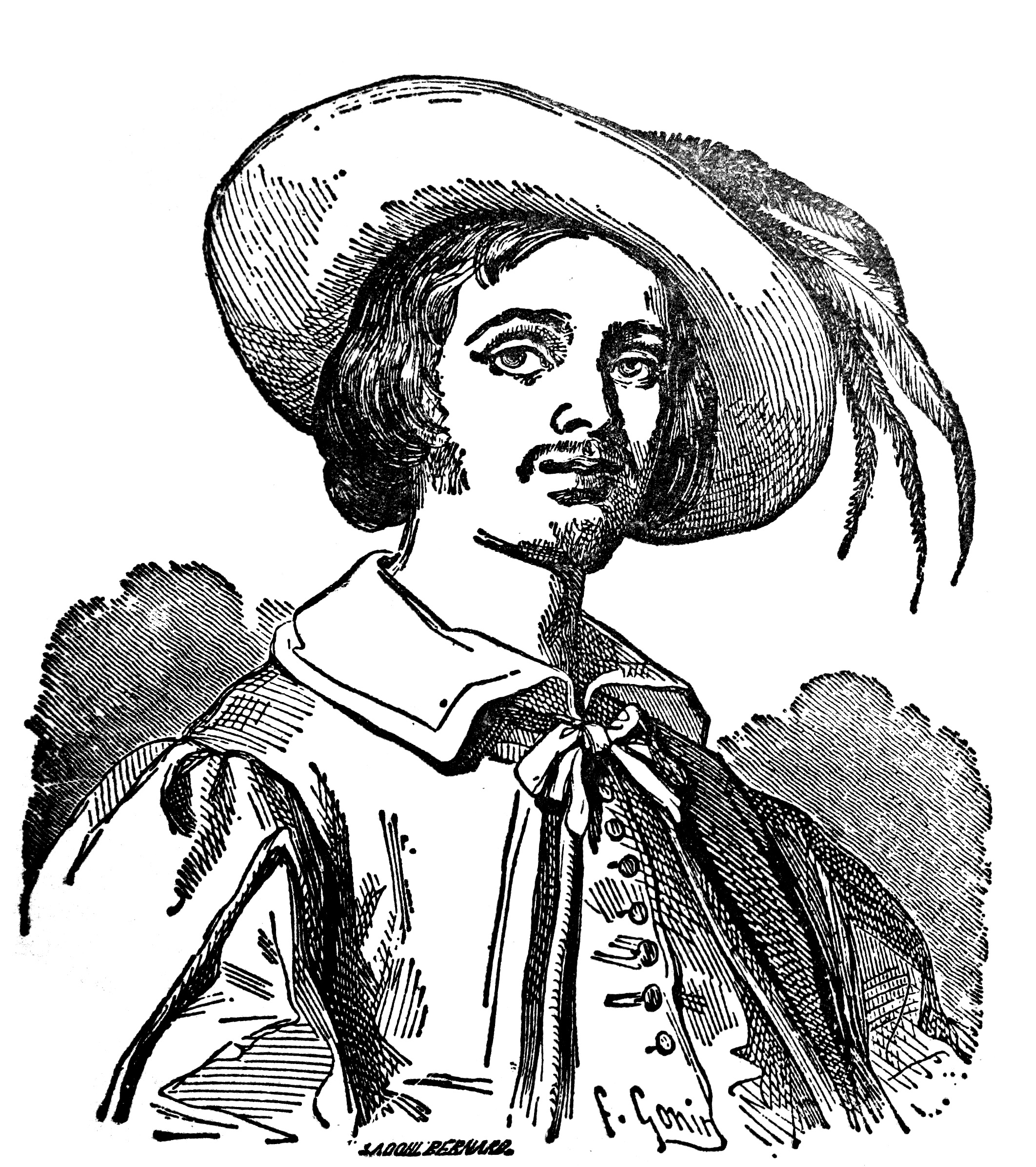
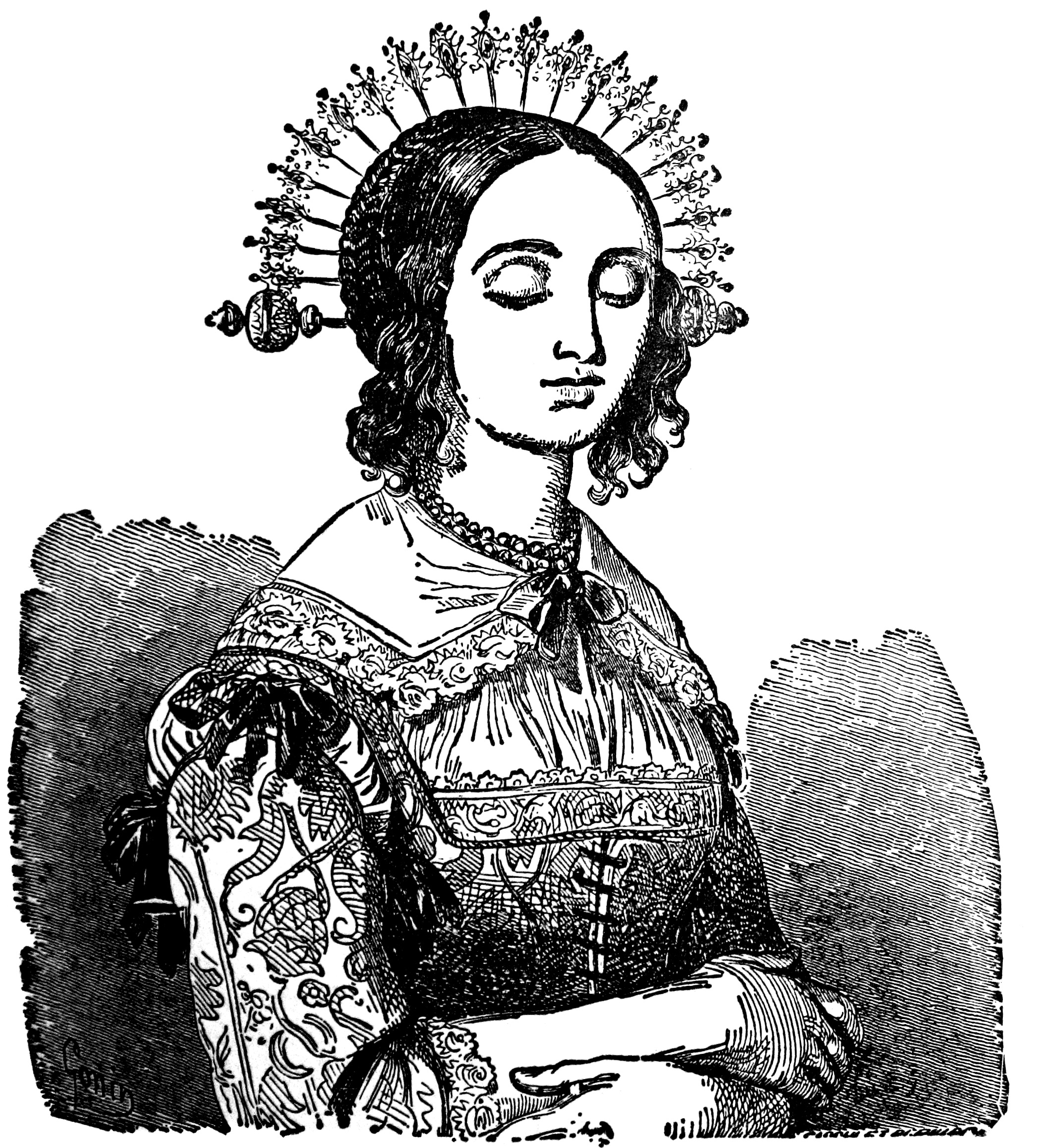
Renzo and Lucia in 1840 illustrations
- Lorenzo "Renzo" Tramaglino is a young silk-weaver of humble origins, engaged to Lucia, whom he loves deeply. Initially rather naïve, he becomes more worldly wise during the story as he is confronted with many difficulties: he is separated from Lucia and then unjustly accused of being a criminal. Renzo is somewhat hot-tempered, but also gentle and honest.
- Lucia Mondella is a kind young woman who loves Renzo; she is pious and devoted, but also very shy and demure. She is forced to flee from her village to escape from Don Rodrigo in one of the most famous scenes of Italian literature, the Addio ai monti or "Farewell to the Mountains".
- Don Abbondio is a Catholic priest who refuses to marry Renzo and Lucia because he has been threatened by Don Rodrigo's men; he meets the two protagonists several times during the novel. The cowardly, morally mediocre Don Abbondio provides most of the book's comic relief; however, he is not merely a stock character, as his moral failings are portrayed by Manzoni with a mixture of irony, sadness and pity, as has been noted by Luigi Pirandello in his essay "On Humour" (Saggio sull'Umorismo).
- Fra Cristoforo is a brave and generous friar who helps Renzo and Lucia, acting as a sort of "father figure" to both and as the moral compass of the novel. Fra Cristoforo was the son of a wealthy family, and joined the Capuchin Order after killing a man.
- Don Rodrigo is a cruel and despicable Spanish nobleman and the novel's main villain. As overbearing local baron, he decides to forcibly prevent the marriage of Renzo and Lucia, threatens to kill Don Abbondio if he marries the two and tries to kidnap Lucia. He is a clear reference to the foreign domination and oppression in Lombardy, first dominated by Spain and later by the Austrian Empire.

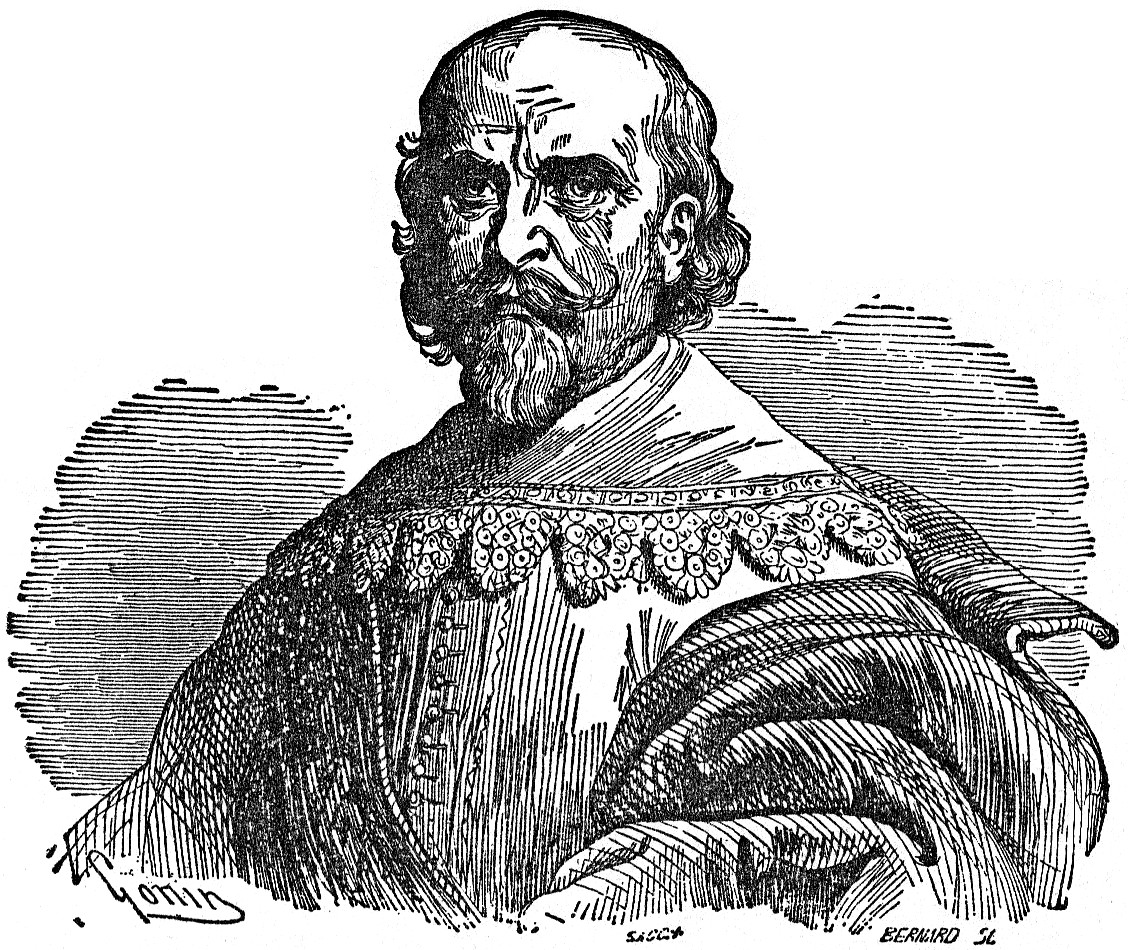
L'Innominato

- L'Innominato (literally the Unnamed) is probably the novel's most complex character, a powerful and feared criminal of very high family who is torn between his ferocious past and the increasing disgust that he feels for his life. Based on the historical character of Francesco Bernardino Visconti, who was really converted by a visit of Federigo Borromeo.
- Agnese Mondella is Lucia's mother: goodhearted and sagacious but often indiscreet.
- Federigo Borromeo is a virtuous and zealous cardinal; an actual historical character, younger cousin of Saint Charles Borromeo.
- Perpetua is Don Abbondio's loquacious servant.
- La monaca di Monza (The Nun of Monza) is a tragic figure, a bitter, frustrated, sexually deprived and ambiguous woman. She befriends Lucia and becomes genuinely fond of her, but her dark past haunts her. This character is based on an actual woman, Marianna de Leyva.
- Griso is one of Don Rodrigo's henchmen, a silent and treacherous man.
- Dr. Azzeccagarbugli ("Quibble-weaver") is a corrupt lawyer.
- Count Attilio is Don Rodrigo's malevolent cousin.
- Nibbio (literally "kite") is the Innominato's right-hand man, who precedes and then happily follows his master's way of redemption.
- Don Ferrante is a phony intellectual and erudite scholar who believes the plague is caused by astrological forces.
- Donna Prassede is Don Ferrante's wife, who is willing to help Lucia but is also an opinionated busybody.

== Significance ==
The novel is commonly described as "the most widely read work in the Italian language." It became a model for subsequent Italian literary fiction. Scholar Sergio Pacifici states that no other Italian literary work, with the exception of the Divine Comedy, "has been the object of more intense scrutiny or more intense scholarship." Many Italians believe that the novel is not fully appreciated abroad. In Italy the novel is considered a true masterpiece of world literature and a basis for the modern Italian language, and as such is widely studied in Italian secondary schools (usually in the second year, when students are 15). Many expressions, quotes and names from the novel are still commonly used in Italian, such as Perpetua (meaning a priest's house worker) or Questo matrimonio non s'ha da fare ("This marriage shall not be celebrated", used ironically).

The novel is not only about love and power: the great questions about evil, about innocents suffering, are the underlying theme of the book. The chapters 31–34, about the famine and the plague, are a powerful picture of material and moral devastation. Manzoni does not offer simple answers but leaves those questions open for the reader to meditate on. The Betrothed has similarities with Walter Scott's historic novel Ivanhoe, although evidently distinct.

I promessi sposi was made into an opera of the same name by Amilcare Ponchielli in 1856, and also by Errico Petrella in 1869. There have been many film versions of I promessi sposi, including I promessi sposi (1908), The Betrothed (1941), The Betrothed (1990), and Renzo and Lucia, made for television in 2004. A "modern opera" version, called The Betrothed Lovers, was written and produced by Michele Guardi with music by Pippo Flora, and first performed in 2010. In May 2015, at a weekly general audience at St. Peter's Square, Pope Francis asked engaged couples to read the novel for edification before marriage.

== English translations ==
=== Unabridged ===
==== 1823 Version ====
Fermo e Lucia (Gli Sposi Promessi) is still untranslated.

==== 1827 Version ====
- The Betrothed Lovers by G. W. Featherstonhaugh (1834)
- Lucia, the Betrothed by Anonymous, published by George Dearborn, New York (1834).
- The Betrothed by Anonymous, published by Richard Bentley (1834)
- The Betrothed by Anonymous, published by James Burns (November 1844). This translation was the one most reprinted in the 19th century.

==== 1842 Version ====
- The Betrothed Lovers by Anonymous, published by Longman, Green, Brown, and Longmans (1845)
- The Betrothed (1924), by Daniel J. Connor
- The Betrothed (1951, with later revisions until 1997), by Archibald Colquhoun, ISBN 978-0-375-71234-0
- The Betrothed (1972), by Bruce Penman, Penguin Books, ISBN 0-14-044274-X
- The Betrothed (2022), by Michael F. Moore, The Modern Library, ISBN 9780679643562. Review

=== Abridged ===
==== 1827 Version ====
- The Betrothed Lovers (1828), by the Reverend Charles Swan, published at Pisa.

==== 1842 Version ====
- Promise of Fidelity (2002), by Omero Sabatini, ISBN 0-7596-5344-5

Reviewing previous translations in 1972, Bruce Penham found that the vast majority of English translations used the first unrevised and inferior 1827 edition of the novel in Italian and often cut material unannounced.

== Film adaptations ==
The novel has been adapted into films on several occasions including:

- The Betrothed (1923)
- The Betrothed (1941)
- The Betrothed (1964)
- I promessi sposi, Italian fiction produced by RAI in 1967, directed by Sandro Bolchi, screenplayed with Riccardo Bacchelli.
- I promessi sposi, Italian fiction produced by RAI in 1989, directed by Salvatore Nocita.
- I promessi sposi, Italian fiction parody produced by RAI in 1990, directed and interpreted by Il Trio (formed by Anna Marchesini, Massimo Lopez and Tullio Solenghi).

== See also ==
- Divine providence
- Paride Zajotti
