= Paride Zajotti =

Italian literary critic

- Born: 1793
- Died: 1843 (aged 49–50)
- Notable work: Review of The Betrothed by Alessandro Manzoni

Paride Zajotti (1793–1843) was an Italian literary critic and a judicial official in the service of the Kingdom of Lombardy–Venetia. He is today chiefly remembered for his early review of Alessandro Manzoni's novel The Betrothed.

== Career as official ==
Zajotti was born in Trento and studied law in Bologna and Pavia. After the uprising of the Carbonari in 1830 he presided over a Tribunale Ciminale that tried, among others, it:Giambattista Bazzoni.

== Literary views ==
Zajotti became a prominent figure in Italian criticism in the late 1810s. In the main literary controversy of the period - the struggle between Romanticism and Classicism - Zajotti came out increasingly firmly on the side of Classicism.

=== Criticism of Manzoni ===
In 1822 he reviewed Manzoni's play Adelchi. In 1827 Zajotti published one of the first reviews of The Betrothed. While highly praising Manzoni's literary accomplishments in the novel, Zajotti took issue with what he saw as a deficient concept of the historical novel, as evinced in Manzoni's novel.

Zajotti proposed to distinguish between two kinds historical novels: 'novels of facts and personages' and 'novels of times and mores'. To him, only the first kind of historical novel - in which real people and events are depicted but under other names - was properly historical and deserving of praise. The other kind, in which fact and fiction are mixed in the lives of real people, Zajotti regarded as inferior and ultimately wrong. His opinion was that The Betrothed was an uneasy mixture of the two, with Manzoni in effect trying, with some success, to rectify his own initial bias towards the second kind.

What befalls Renzo and Lucia may seem to be the main concern only to those who wish to apply the usual norms to his novel: but careful reflection will show that its first objective is to describe the course of civil society in the Duchy of Milan at the beginning of the seventeenth century.

==== Answer by Mazzini ====
One of Mazzini's first published works, in the journal Indicatore Genovese, was a rejoinder to Zajotti's review in which he rejected altogether Zajotti's dichotomy.

== Relations with Mazzini ==
Although they were opponents in literature and politics, in the early 1830s Mazzini had a high regard for Zajotti, saying of him that he was just and discriminating. Later, however, their relations soured and in 1842 Mazzini already referred to Zajotti as an "enemy scout" and a "mercenary".
