= Jean Pecquet =

French scientist

- Born: 9 May 1622; Dieppe, Province of Normandy, France
- Died: 26 February 1674 (aged 51); Paris
- Education: University of Montpellier
- Known for: Investigation of the thoracic duct
- Scientific career
- Fields: Physics, psychology, physiology

Jean Pecquet (9 May 1622, Dieppe, Seine-Maritime – 26 February 1674) was a French scientist. He studied the expansion of air, wrote on psychology, and is also known for investigating the thoracic duct. Furthermore, he studied the nature of vision.

== Life ==
Jean Pecquet studied medicine at Montpellier, where he investigated the important discovery (in 1622, by Gaspare Aselli) of the course of the lacteal vessels, including the receptaculum chyli (or reservoir of Pecquet, as it is sometimes called) and the termination of the principal lacteal vessel, the thoracic duct, into the left subclavian vein. He dissected the eye and measured its dimensions. Contrary to Edme Mariotte, he maintained that the retina, not the choroid, was the principal organ of vision.

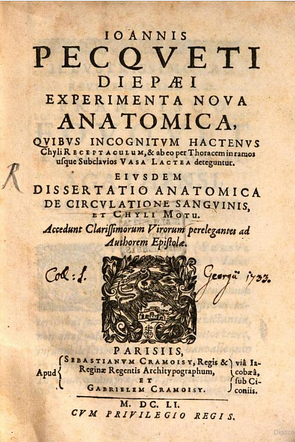
Experimenta Nova Anatomica (New Anatomical Experiments)

== Selected written works ==
- Experimenta Nova Anatomica (Paris, 1651; English translation, as New Anatomical Experiments, 1653)
- De Circulatione Sanguinis et Chyli Motu (1653)
- De Thoracicis Lacteis (1653)
- Nouvelle découverte touchant la veüe (Paris, 1668) (With Frederic Leonard)

== Terms ==
- Pecquet, cistern of, reservoir of — The receptaculum chyli.
