= Giuseppe Ripamonti =

Italian historian (1573–1643)

Doctor Giuseppe Ripamonti
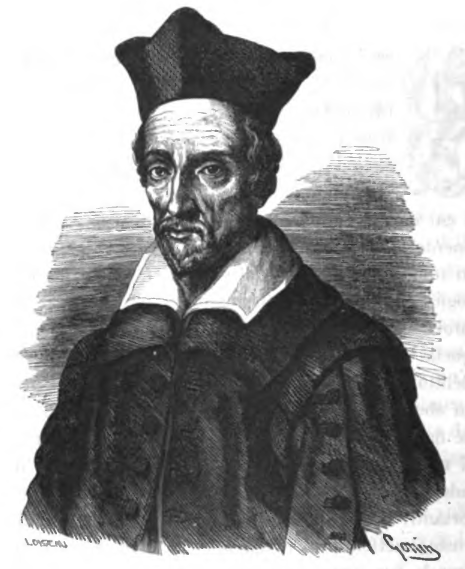
- Portrait of Giuseppe Ripamonti, engraving by Francesco Gonin, 1840.
- Born: July 1573; Colle Brianza, Duchy of Milan
- Died: 11 August 1643 (aged 70); Rovagnate, Duchy of Milan
- Occupations: Historian, renaissance humanist, latinist
- Board member of: College of doctors of the Ambrosiana Library
- Parent(s): Bartolomeo Ripamonti and Lucrezia Ripamonti

Academic background
- Education: Archiepiscopal seminary of Milan
- Influences: Tristano Calco

Academic work
- Era: Renaissance
- Institutions: Archiepiscopal seminary of Milan
- Notable works: Historiarum patriae in continuationem Tristani Calchi libri XXIII (1641-43); De peste Mediolani quae fuit anno 1630 (1640)
- Influenced: Alessandro Manzoni

Ecclesiastical career
- Religion: Christianity
- Church: Catholic Church
- Ordained: 17 December 1605

Giuseppe Ripamonti (July 1573 – 11 August 1643) was an Italian Catholic priest and historian. Ripamonti was a prolific writer, to the extent that he can be considered as the most important Milanese writer of the first half of the seventeenth century, alongside Federico Borromeo.

He wrote in Latin Historia Ecclesiae Mediolanensis (1625) ("History of the Church of Milan"). He is perhaps better known for the De peste Mediolani quae fuit anno 1630 (1640) ("About the plague that occurred in Milan in year 1630"), which relates the events occurring in the city during the 1629–1631 Italian bubonic plague. Alessandro Manzoni used this account to describe in detail the effects of the plague in his masterpiece, The Betrothed. In 1841, the latin chronicle of the plague by Ripamonti was published in Italian translation by Francesco Cusani.

== Biography ==
Ripamonti was born of humble parents in Colle Brianza. A protégé of Cardinal Federico Borromeo (cousin of St Charles Borromeo) he completed his humanistic education at the Archiepiscopal seminary in Milan. First employed as a teacher at Monza, he finally settled down in Milan, as a professor of rhetoric at the Archiepiscopal seminary, only after several years of indecision about accepting an offer to accompany the retiring governor to Spain.

Ripamonti became a Doctor of the Biblioteca Ambrosiana in September 1607. The task of the doctors of the Ambrosiana was primarily the study of manuscripts and printed books, from which they might publish old texts or learned dissertations in history or philosophy. Amongst the scholars working at the Ambrosiana, Ripamonti was tasked with looking after Church history.

Ripamonti was a quarrelsome sort who had a sharp tongue and consequently many enemies. In 1617, when the first volume of his Historia Ecclesiae Mediolanensis appeared to much praise, there was also criticism from many who did not look favourably on some of the passages of the work, and judged them unedifying. They discovered errors in Ripamonti's book and falsely accused him of having used spurious letters of Gregory the Great.

In 1618 the Conservatori of the Ambrosiana suspended Ripamonti from his position and the Archbishop had to agree to the imprisonment of this Ambrosiana Scholar whom he himself had appointed and to initiate a trial which lasted four years. In 1622 Ripamonti was sentenced to five years of imprisonment, but Cardinal Borromeo commuted the sentence to confinement within the archbishop's palace, thus allowing him to finish the second and the third volumes of his Historia relating to the recently bygone era of Charles Borromeo. In 1630, still thanks to the indulgence of Federico Borromeo, Ripamonti was re-admitted to the Ambrosiana. Someone said that, although Federico did indeed keep Ripamonti in prison for five years, he saved him from the clutches of the Roman Inquisition. Others criticized the cardinal, accusing him of timidity.

On 23 December 1635, the Council of Seventy Decurioni awarded him the title of State Historian (a title never before used in Milan) with an attached salary. Ripamonti thus assumed the responsibility of taking forward the Historia patria from the year 1313, that is from the final year covered in the Historia of Tristano Calco that had been recently published (1628).

The release, in 1641, of the first volume of Ripamonti's Historia patria, in an edition by the Malatesta family. This volume covered Milanese history from 1313 to 1558, that is, until the era of Charles V; in 1641 De peste was also released, a fundamentally important record of that recent painful tragedy.

In December 1643, the second volume of the Historia patria was released, depicting the history of Milan from 1559 to 1584, that is, the era of Charles Borromeo. Ripamonti died at Rovagnate in that same year. However he left the material ready for the continuation of the work: three other printed volumes followed between 1646 and 1648, the first two edited by Stefano Sclatter, and the third by Orazio Landi. This third and final volume is of particular importance, covering the era of Federico Borromeo, and this volume went up to the most recent past, that is until 1641, thus establishing itself as the greatest work of historiography of the time.

== Scholarship and correspondence ==
Ripamonti's Historia patria is extremely rich in information; however this information is not always well-considered and often unravels into a thread of historical interpretation. The excellent Latin adopted is often pompous, based on the model of Livy and embellished with a touch of baroque style.

Ripamonti corresponded with scholars all over Europe, including Isaac Casaubon and the German philologist Caspar Schoppe.

== Legacy ==
Alessandro Manzoni revived the fame of Ripamonti and praised him in I Promessi Sposi, borrowing from him some of the most salient episodes in the novel. Charles Mackay in his Extraordinary Popular Delusions and the Madness of Crowds (1841), which contains a sections on the Milan plague, used Ripamonti's De peste as a primary source.

== Works ==
Titlepage of Ripamonti's De peste, Milan, 1641. Engraving by Cesare Bassano

- Ripamonti, Giuseppe (1617). Historiarum Ecclesiae Mediolanensis libri (in Latin). Vol. 1. Milano: Collegij Ambrosiani typogr.
- Ripamonti, Giuseppe (1625). Historiarum Ecclesiae Mediolanensis libri (in Latin). Vol. 2. Milano: Collegij Ambrosiani typogr.
- Ripamonti, Giuseppe (1628). Historiarum Ecclesiae Mediolanensis libri (in Latin). Vol. 3. Milano: Collegij Ambrosiani typogr.
- Ripamonti, Giuseppe (1641). Iosephi Ripamontii canonici scalensis chronistae urbis Mediolani de peste quae fuit anno MLCXXX. Libri V desumpti ex annalibus urbis quos LX decurionum autoritate scribebat (in Latin). Milano: apud Malatestas, Regios ac Ducales Typographos.
- Ripamonti, Giuseppe (1841). La peste di Milano del 1630. Libri cinque cavati dagli annali della città e scritti per ordine dei LX decurioni dal Canonico della Scala Giuseppe Ripamonti istoriografo milanese volgarizzati per la prima volta dall'originale latino da Francesco Cusani con introduzione e note (in Italian). Milano: Tipografia Libreria Perotta e C.
- Historiarum patriae in continuationem Tristani Calchi libri XXIII, usque ad mortem Federici Card. Borromei, Milano, 1641-1643.
- Alcuni brani delle Storie patrie di Giuseppe Ripamonti per la prima volta tradotti dall'originale latino dal conte Tullio Dandolo, Milano, coi tipi di Antonio Arzione e C., 1856.
- Ripamonti, Giuseppe (2009). Cesare Repossi (ed.). La peste di Milano del 1630 (in Italian). premessa di Angelo Stella. Milano: Casa del Manzoni. ISBN 978-8887924848.
