= Luigi Riccardi =

Italian painter (1808–1877)

Luigi Riccardi (1808 in Lyon – 1877 in Milan) was an Italian painter.

== Career ==
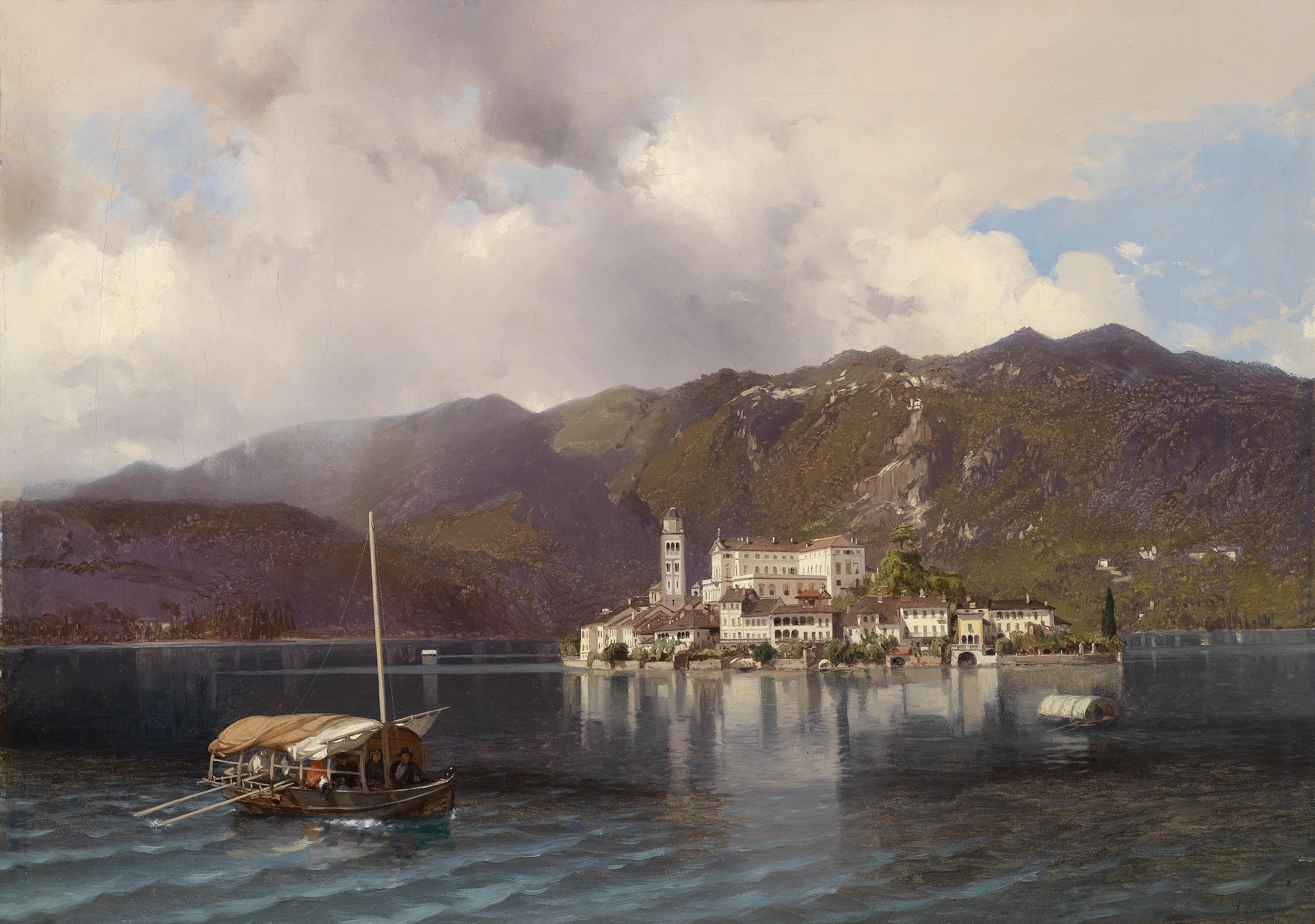
Isola San Giulio

He was mainly a landscape and seascape painter. He trained under Giuseppe Bisi, and was influenced by Massimo d'Azeglio.

Luigi Riccardi joined Francesco Gonin in illustrating the 1840 second edition of Alessandro Manzoni's The Betrothed, drawing some famous landscapes.

In 1865, he began teaching at the Brera; his work is mostly found in Milan, including at the Galleria d'Arte Moderna and Poldi-Pezzoli Museum. Eugenio Gignous was one of his pupils.
