= Domenico Falcini =

Domenico Falcini (Siena, 8 May 1575-c.1632) was an Italian Renaissance painter and engraver.

Not much is known about Falcini's life except through his works. He primarily painted religious-themed works for church commissions. One work based on an engraving by Falcini The Judgement of Christ, with Nineteen Shields (copy in Uffizi, Florence) is part of the National Inventory of Continental European Paintings collection. It is documented that Falcini applied to the grand-ducal administration in Florence for the privilege of engraving a new single sheet version (the original was three sheets) in 1618.

== Gallery ==
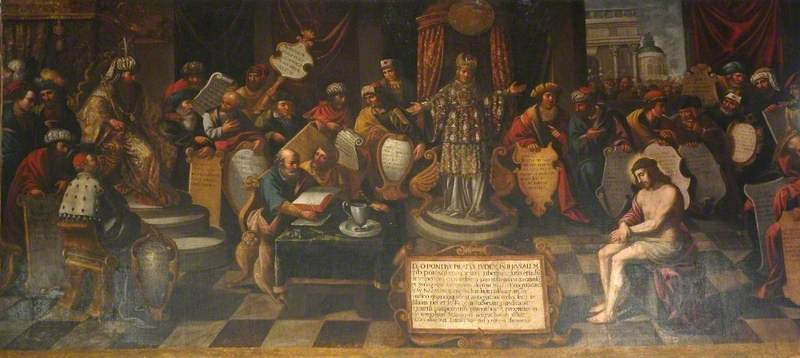

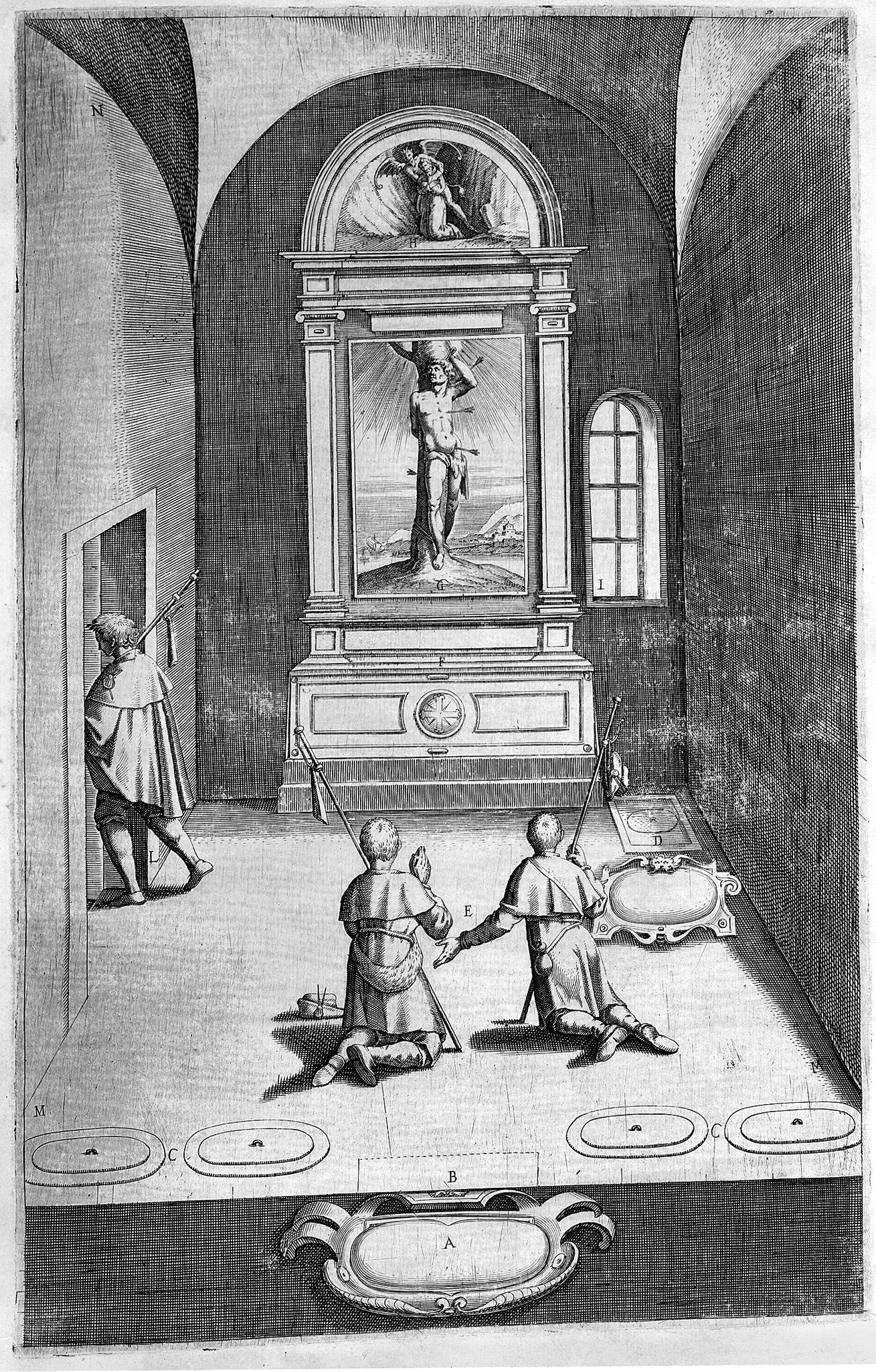

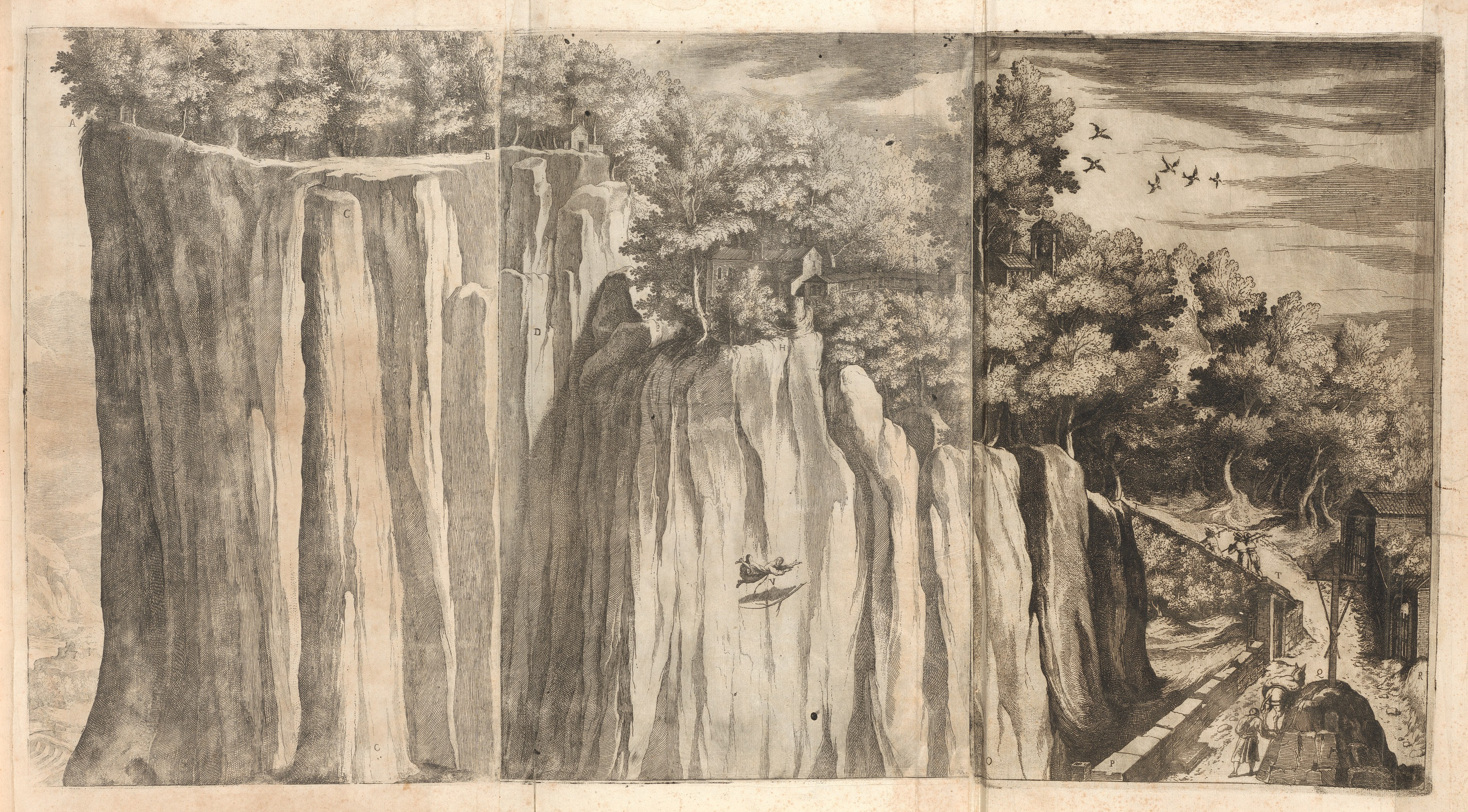

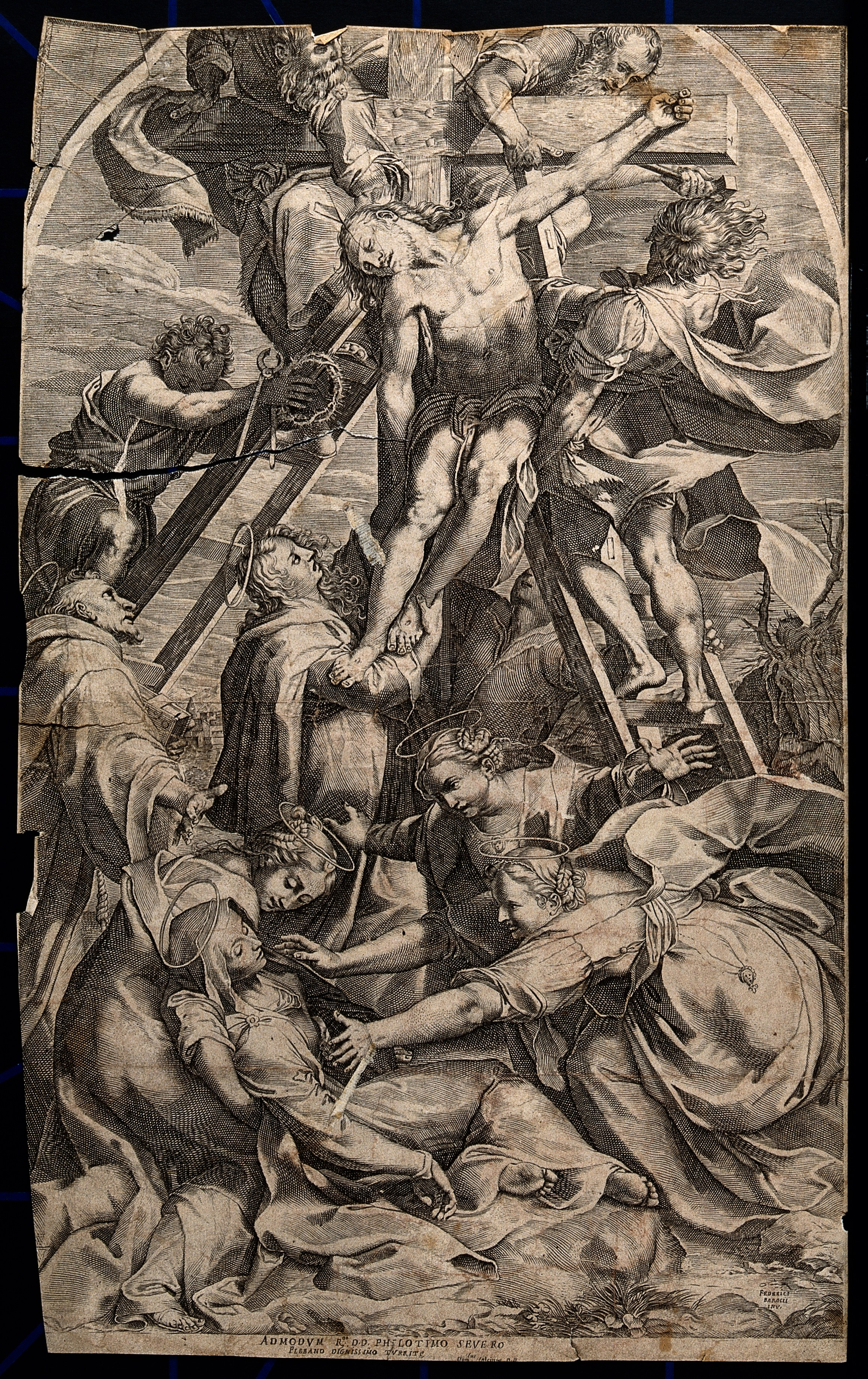
