= Ernest, Count of Isenburg-Grenzau =

Spanish general in the Thirty Years' War (1584–1664)

Ernst Graf von Isenburg
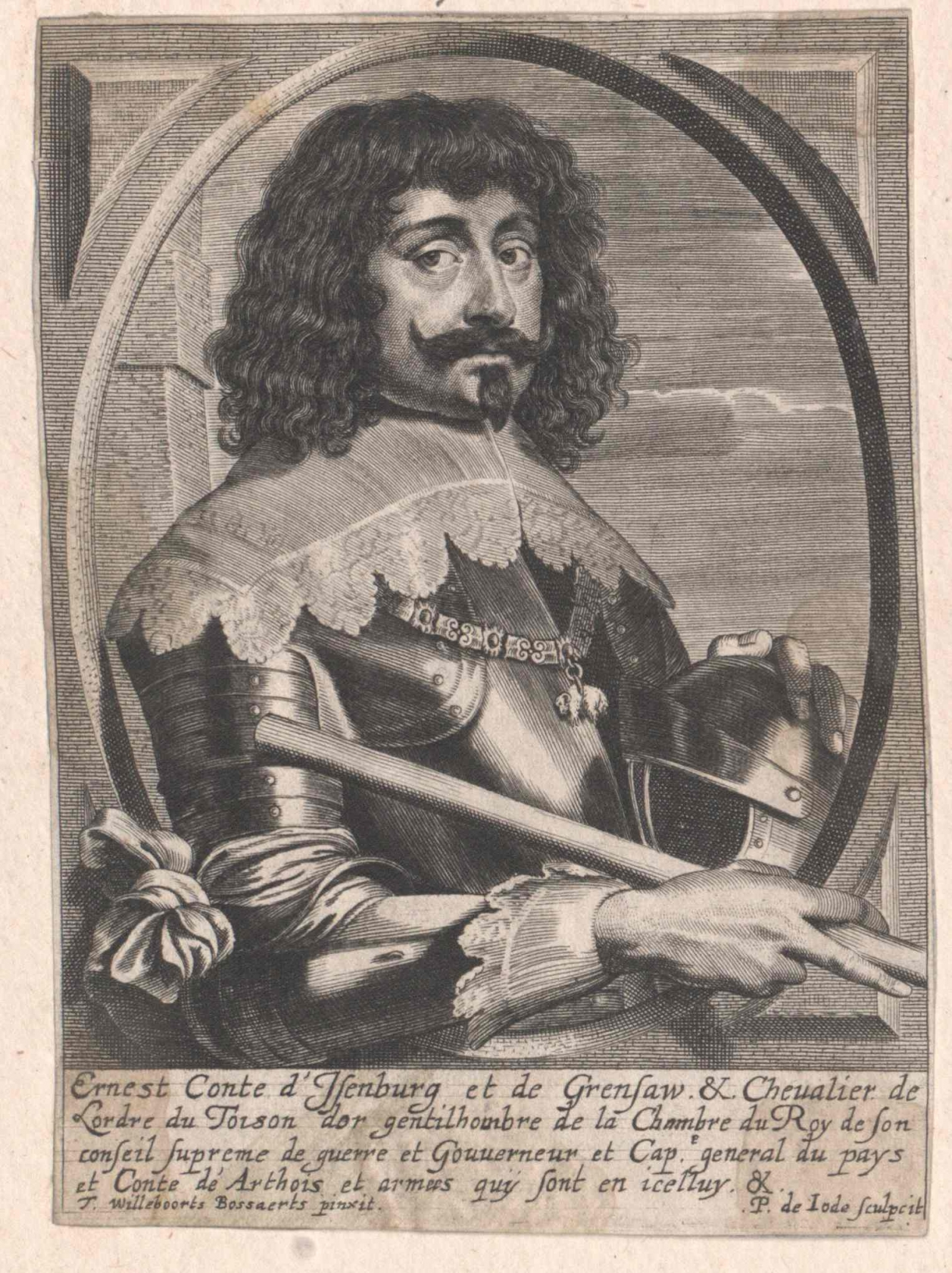
- Born: 1584; Brussels, Spanish Netherlands
- Died: 1664 (aged 79–80) Brussels, Spanish Netherlands
- Buried: Cathedral of St. Michael and St. Gudula
- Allegiance: Spanish Empire
- Conflicts: Battle of Rocroi

Count Ernst von Isenburg-Grenzau (born 1584, died May 30, 1664, in Brussels) was a Spanish general in the Thirty Years' War and the last representative of the Isenburg-Grenzau line.

== Origin ==
His parents were Salentin IX of Isenburg-Grenzau (1532–1610) and his wife Countess Antonie Wilhelmine von Arenberg (born March 1, 1557, died February 26, 1626), steward of the Infanta Isabella and sister of Karl von Arenberg. Salentin had been elected Archbishop and Elector of Cologne, but resigned after 10 years to prevent his line from dying out. Ernst also had an older brother named Salentin, who fell in imperial military service on December 5, 1619.

== Life ==
He went into Spanish service by 1614 at the latest and fought under Spinola in the Palatinate and the Netherlands. After the Eighty Years' War broke out again, he took part in the siege of Jülich (1621–1622). During the siege of Breda in 1625 he commanded one of the four camps near the city. He is also shown behind Spinola in the well-known picture by Velasquez. In 1628 he received the Order of the Golden Fleece from king Philip IV.

At the beginning of 1633, as general of artillery, he led an advance in support of the Elector of Cologne, Ferdinand, against the Swedes. He captured Nonnenwerth, Olbrück Castle, Saffenburg Castle and Landskron Castle on the Rhine and along the Ahr. When the Swedes under Baudissin took Hammerstein Castle in return and attacked Remagen, Isenburg moved towards them and pushed them back. In mid-March, however, he had to lift the siege of Andernach and retreat across the Rhine in the direction of Linz am Rhein before the Swedish relief army led by Baudissin's successor, Christian I, Count Palatine of Birkenfeld-Bischweiler.

In 1636 the king appointed him governor and governor-general of the provinces of Namur and Artois. In August of that year he took the border town of Hirson. In 1638 he took part in the successful relief of the besieged St. Omer under Prince Thomas of Savoy and Ottavio Piccolomini. In 1643 he besieged the fortress of Rocroi on the French border. Francisco de Melo wanted to come to his aid, but then met a relief army under Louis de Bourbon. It came to the Battle of Rocroi, which ended in a heavy Spanish defeat. Isenburg survived the battle but retired from military life afterwards. He succeeded Count von Fontaine as Generalfeldmeister of the Flemish army, since he fell in battle. On 29 September 1645 he was also appointed head of finances (grand treasurer) of the Netherlands, the tax administration of the king of Spain. Isenburg lived in Brussels, where he also died, his county was looked after by administrators.

His tomb is in the Cathedral of St. Michael and St. Gudula.
