= Andrea Cantelmo =

Neapolitan commander

Andrea Cantelmo Duke of Popoli
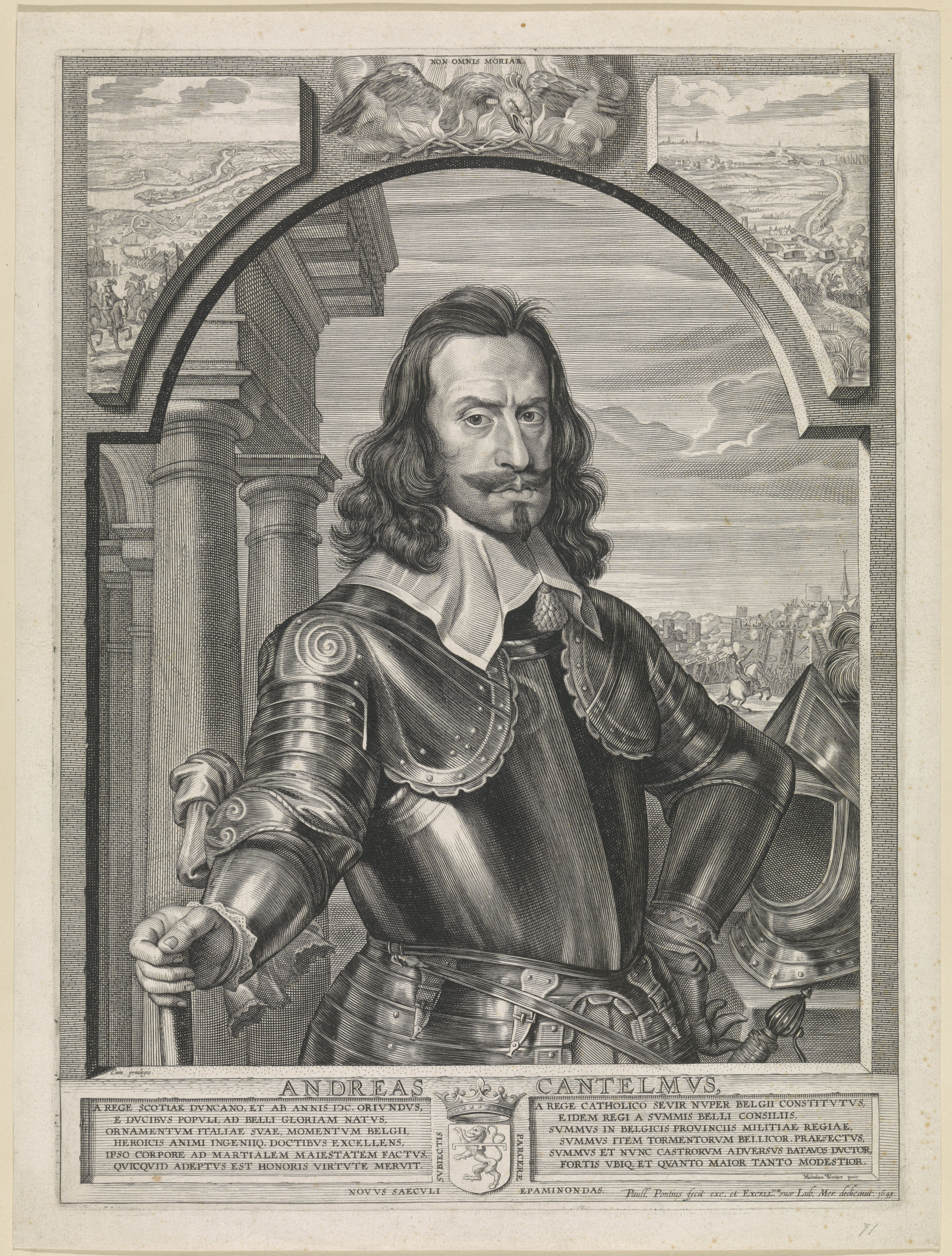
- Portrait of Andrea Cantelmo, engraved by Paulus Pontius after Michaelina Wautier
- Born: 2 August 1598
- Died: 5 November 1645 (aged 47)
- Military career
- Allegiance: Habsburg
- Service years: 1620–1645
- Rank: Maestre de campo
- Conflicts: Thirty Years' War; Valtellina War; Relief of Genoa; War of the Mantuan Succession; Eighty Years' War; Battle of Kallo; Franco-Spanish War (1635–59); Siege of Frankenthal; Siege of La Capelle; First siege of Corbie; Siege of Arras; Catalan Revolt

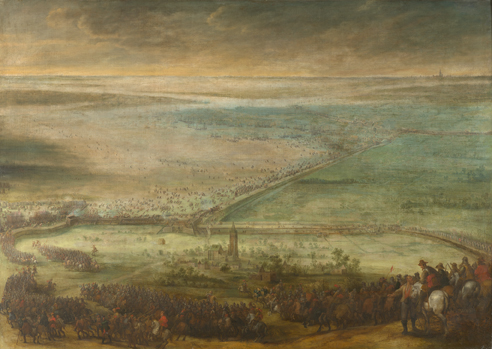
The Battle of Kallo. Oil on canvas by Peter Snayers.

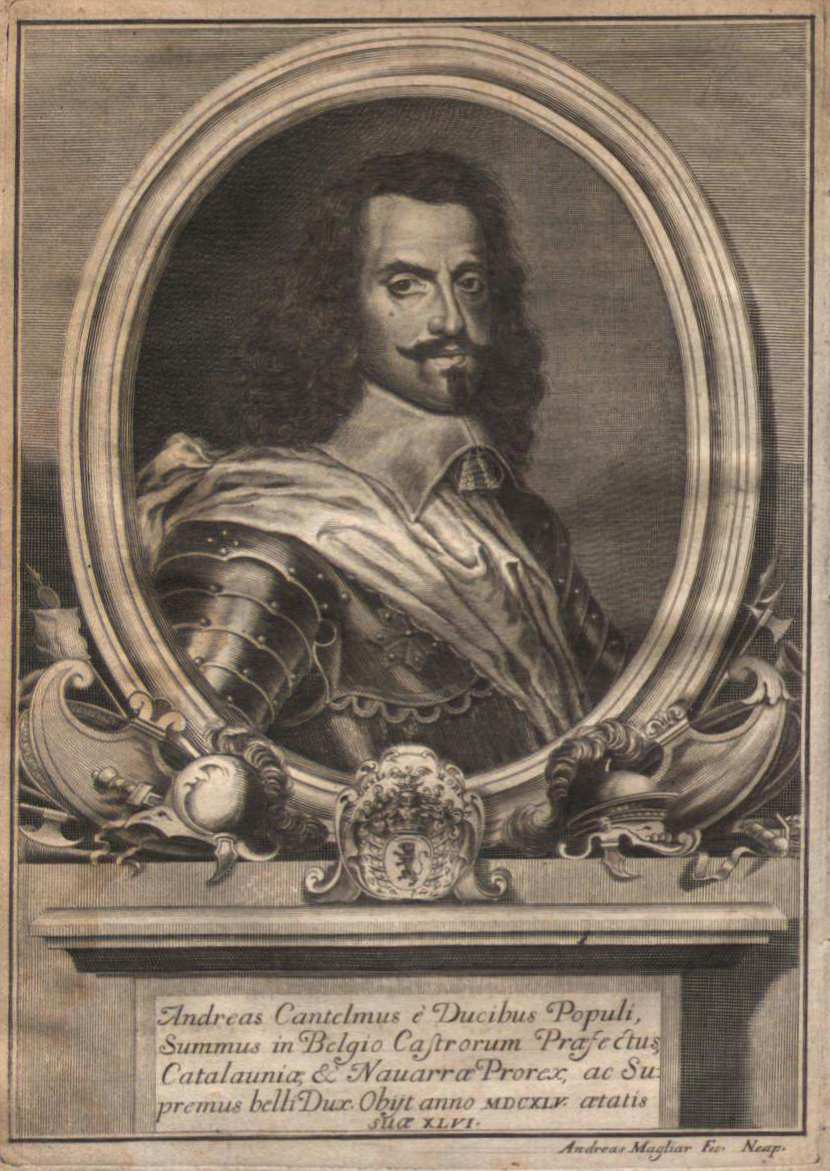
Andrea Cantelmo, copperplate engraving by Andreas Magliar published as an illustration by Lionardo di Capua, Vita di D. Andrea Cantelmo, Naples, 1693. National Library of Spain.

Andrea Cantelmo (2 August 1598 – 5 November 1645) was a Neapolitan commander and inventor during the Thirty Years' War, the War of the Mantuan Succession, the second phase of the Eighty Years' War, the Franco-Spanish War (1635–59), and the Reapers War.

== Life ==
Cantelmo, son of the duke of Popoli and of Laura d'Evoli, was born in Pettorano sul Gizio on 2 August 1598. In 1620 he was given command of a company of arquebusiers by the viceroy of Naples Gaspare Borgia. With his new company he set out for the war of Valtellina. Where he participated in the battles of Tirano and Morbegno, the siege of Chiavenna and the relief of Coira. After serving in the Valtelline he transferred to the army of Emperor Ferdinand II as a cavalry commander, serving in Bohemia, distinguishing himself in the battles against Gábor Bethlen. He then returned to Italy to take part in the Relief of Genoa. He remained in Italy to serve in the initial stages of the War of the Mantuan Succession, taking part in the Siege of Casale, and the battles of Verrua, Nice, Rosignano and Pontestura.

In 1631 he transferred again, to the Army of Flanders, serving in the Rhineland and later in Picardy. During the outbreak of the Franco-Spanish War in 1635 he played a role in the defense of the Lowlands in response to the and in the subsequent Spanish offensive in French Picardy, besieging Lachapelle, Le Châtelet, and Corbie. At these sieges he began using a bomb of his own invention, made of bronze spheres filled with explosives. As general of artillery he played an important role in the Habsburg victory in the Battle of Kallo (1638) in which following an intense war council, Cantelmo's proposal of a frontal assault prevailed. He launched his attack on Veerbruk under the cover of night, and after seven hours of fierce fighting, forced the Dutch to abandon their forward positions and retreat into the fort. Despite determined resistance, the defenders eventually broke, fleeing toward boats in an attempt to escape – a move quickly mimicked by their comrades stationed at the fort of Kallo. However, the low tide prevented the boats from reaching shore, a vulnerability Cantelmo exploited decisively. He inflicted severe casualties on the fleeing troops, leaving the waters littered with bodies, and captured roughly 2,200 prisoners, 85 ships laden with ammunition and provisions, 19 cannons, 56 flags, and 4 standards.

In 1641 Cantelmo was appointed to a council of six to govern the Spanish Netherlands. In response to renewed French aggression on Flanders, Cantelmo successfully managed internal unrest among unpaid troops, raising funds to settle their wages. In 1642, he invaded the Boulonnais, capturing eleven fortresses and disrupting French war plans. Afterward, he advanced into Brabant, securing key positions near Maastricht. Over time, however, strategic conflicts emerged between Cantelmo and the new governor, Francisco de Melo, notably in 1643, when insufficient resources forced Cantelmo to abandon his offensive in the Calais-Gravelines-Ardres region. Melo, ignoring Cantelmo's counsel, advanced into France, resulting in the devastating Spanish defeat in the Battle of Rocroi on May 19, 1643.

In 1644, after the downfall of Olivares, Cantelmo was recalled to Spain and appointed to the War Council, where he played a key role in shaping the campaign in Catalonia in the Reapers War. Leading military operations himself, he successfully captured Lerida in July. Later, he was named Captain General of the Army of Catalonia, replacing the Portuguese commander Felipe de Silva. With an army of 5,000 infantry and 2,500 cavalry, he launched an assault on Tarragona, driving out the French forces. By September, he had also retaken Balaguer and several other strategic locations in the plain of Urgell. However, his campaign faced setbacks. After the French, led by Harcourt, captured Rosas, Cantelmo initially achieved some victories against French troops advancing into Aragon from Roussillon. Despite these successes, he suffered a major defeat at Balaguer, which ultimately forced him to relinquish command back to de Silva. Following this, he was reassigned to lead the Army of Navarre.

Before he could take up this final command, Cantelmo died at Alcubierre on November 5, 1645.

His military treatises and war memoirs have been lost, though some of his views on politics and warfare were later published by Di Capua. He is also credited with inventing flying mines and a repeating pistol capable of firing twenty-five shots. He was interested in history and politics, and wrote on the art of war, but his writings have not been preserved. He maintained a correspondence on history and mathematics with the humanist Erycius Puteanus, whom he met following the Battle of Kallo when in Leuven for medical treatment.

== Bibliography ==
- Lionardo Di Capua, Vita di Andrea Cantelmo (Naples, Giacomo Raillard, 1693). Copy from National Central Library (Rome) available on Google Books. Accessed 14 Feb. 2015.
