= Honnecourt =

Honnecourt may refer to:

- Villard de Honnecourt, 13th century artist from Picardy, France
- Honnecourt-sur-Escaut, a commune in the Nord department of France
- Battle of Honnecourt, in 1642, during the Franco-Spanish War
