= Battle of Rocroi =

1643 battle of the Thirty Years' War between French and Spanish forces

Coordinates: 49°55′10″N 4°31′40″E

- Part of the Thirty Years' War and the Franco-Spanish War (1635–1659)
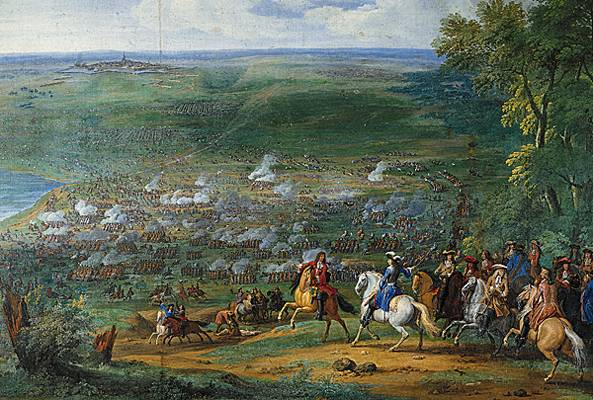
- La Bataille de Rocroi by Sauveur Le Conte
Date	19 May 1643
Location	Rocroi, France
Result	French victory

Belligerents
France	(Spain) Spanish Empire

Commanders and leaders
(Kingdom of France) Le Grand Condé; (Kingdom of France) Jean de Gassion; (Kingdom of France) Duke of La Ferté-Senneterre; (Kingdom of France) Marquis of Espenan	(Spanish Empire) Francisco de Melo; (Spanish Empire) Duke of Alburquerque; (Spanish Empire) Paul-Bernard de Fontaines †; (Spanish Empire) Graf von Isenburg

Strength
23,000; 16,000 infantry; 7,000 cavalry; 12 guns	23,000–26,000; 15,000–19,000 infantry; 8,000 cavalry; 18 guns

Casualties and losses
4,000	7,300–15,000 dead, wounded or captured 18 guns

The Battle of Rocroi, fought on 19 May 1643, was a major engagement of the Thirty Years' War between a French army, led by the 21-year-old Duke of Enghien (later known as the Great Condé) and Spanish forces under General Francisco de Melo only five days after the accession of Louis XIV to the throne of France after his father's death. Rocroi shattered the myth of invincibility of the Spanish tercios, the pike and shot infantry units that had dominated European battlefields for the previous 120 years. The battle is therefore often considered to mark the end of Spanish military greatness and the beginning of French hegemony in Europe in the second half-17th century during the reign of Louis XIV. After Rocroi, the Spanish progressively transformed the tercio system incorporating more of the line infantry doctrine used by the French over time.

== Background ==
Since 1618, the Thirty Years' War had raged in Germany, with the Catholic Austrian and Spanish Habsburgs fighting the Protestant states. In 1635, fearing a peace too favorable to the House of Habsburg after a string of Protestant defeats, France decided to intervene directly and declared war on the Habsburgs and Spain, despite France being a Catholic power that had suppressed its own Protestant rebellions. An initial invasion of the Spanish Netherlands ended in failure, and the French retreated to their borders.

December 1642 brought the death of Cardinal Richelieu, the chief minister to Louis XIII of France, followed by the King's own death on 14 May 1643, when his four-year-old son Louis XIV inherited the throne. Despite receiving overtures of peace amid the precarious domestic situation, the new French chief minister, Mazarin, did not wish to end the war and exerted French military pressure on Franche-Comté, Catalonia, and the Spanish Netherlands.

The Battle of Honnecourt in May 1642 had opened the way towards Paris, and the renowned Spanish Army of Flanders advanced through the Ardennes into northern France with 27,000 men in the hope of relieving pressure on Catalonia and in Franche-Comté.

== Prelude ==
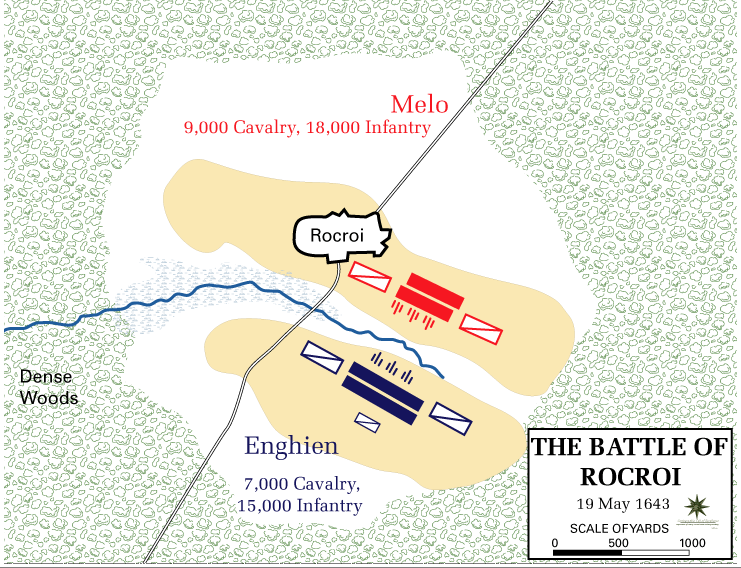
Map of the troop dispositions

En route, the Spanish troops, under Francisco de Melo, laid siege to the fortified town of Rocroi. The Duc d'Enghien, the commander of a French army in Amiens, was appointed to stop the Spanish incursion. He was 21 but had already proven himself a bold and cunning commander, and he had the support of worthy subordinates, such as Marshal Jean de Gassion. French forces in the area numbered 23,000. Enghien advanced to meet de Melo's numerically superior army along the Meuse River. On 17 May, he learned the king had died but kept the news secret from his army.

Word reached Enghien that 6,000 Spanish reinforcements were on their way to Rocroi, and he hurried there on 18 May. He decided on an attack before de Melo's forces could be reinforced against the advice of his older subordinate commanders. He ordered his army forward through the only available approach, a defile between woods and marshes that the Spanish had failed to block. That afternoon, the French took up position on a ridge overlooking Rocroi.

Learning of the French advance, de Melo decided to engage the oncoming forces, rather than invest in the siege, as he deemed his army stronger. Accordingly, the Spanish army formed up between the French and Rocroi, and both sides prepared for battle the next day. The Spanish expected a decisive victory, which would compel the French to negotiate peace.

The French army was arranged in two lines of infantry in the center, squadrons of cavalry on each wing, and a thin line of artillery at the front. The Spanish army was similarly positioned but with the center infantry in their traditional "tercio" squares, with some 8,000 highly trained Spanish in front and mercenary infantry behind them. The two armies exchanged fire in the afternoon of 18 May, but the full battle did not occur until the following day.

== Battle ==
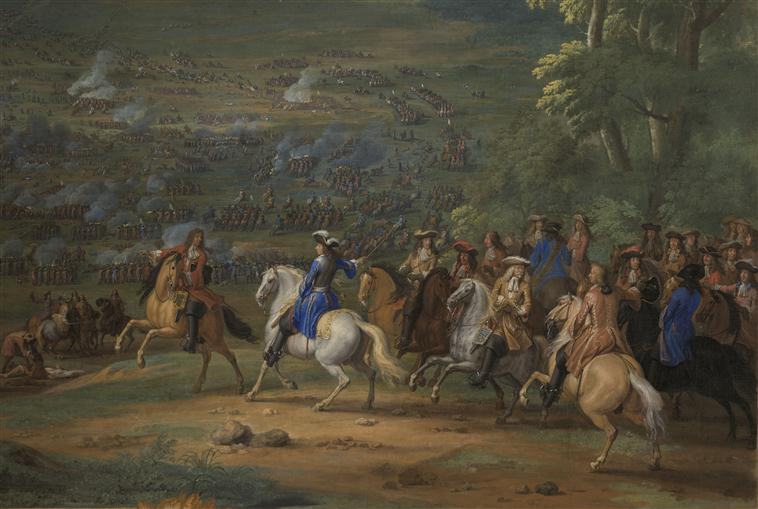
Duc d'Enghien at the Battle of Rocroi

The battle began early in the morning of 19 May on open farmland in front of Rocroi with a French cavalry attack on the Spanish left. The French horsemen on the right under Jean de Gassion pushed back the Spanish cavalry opposite, and Enghien followed up by swiftly charging the exposed Spanish left flank. The Spanish horsemen were routed, and Enghien moved against the elite Spanish infantrymen, which had engaged their French counterparts and were besting them. At the same time, the French cavalry on the left, against Enghien's orders, attacked the Spanish right and were repulsed. The Spanish mounted a counter-attack, initially very successful, but their advance was eventually halted by French reserves. At this point, the French left and center were in distress.

The battle was still inconclusive, with both armies succeeding on their right but bloodied on their left.

=== Enghien's maneuver ===
Enghien, aware that his left and center were bending under pressure, decided not to pull them back, but to exploit his momentum on the right flank. He ordered a cavalry encirclement, which was achieved via a sweeping strike and got behind the Spanish lines. He then smashed through the back of the Spanish infantry in the center and went on to crash into the rear of the Spanish right-flank cavalry that had engaged his reserves. The move was a complete success, and when the Spanish cavalry scattered, it left the infantry isolated, prompting the Spanish artillery crew to flee the battlefield. Regarded as the finest in Europe for over a century, the Spanish infantry, now enveloped on all sides, held its formations and repulsed two French cavalry attacks. Enghien massed his artillery alongside the captured Spanish guns, and relentlessly hammered the Spanish squares. The Germans and Walloons deserted, overwhelmed and broken, but the veteran Spanish tercios remained on the field with their commander.

=== Concluding battle ===
Despite heavy artillery fire and the death of their commander de Fontaines, the Spanish absorbed additional French cavalry attacks without breaking formation. Impressed with their gallantry in combat, Enghien offered surrender terms similar to those obtained by a besieged garrison in a fortress, and the Spanish accepted. When Enghien personally rode forward to take their surrender, however, some of the Spanish apparently believed that this was the beginning of a French cavalry charge and opened fire on him. Angered by this seeming treachery, the French attacked again, this time without quarter and with devastating result. The Spanish army was virtually destroyed. Some Spanish sources state that only three of the five Spanish infantry battalions were destroyed by the French, while the remaining two were allowed to leave the field with deployed flags and weapons.

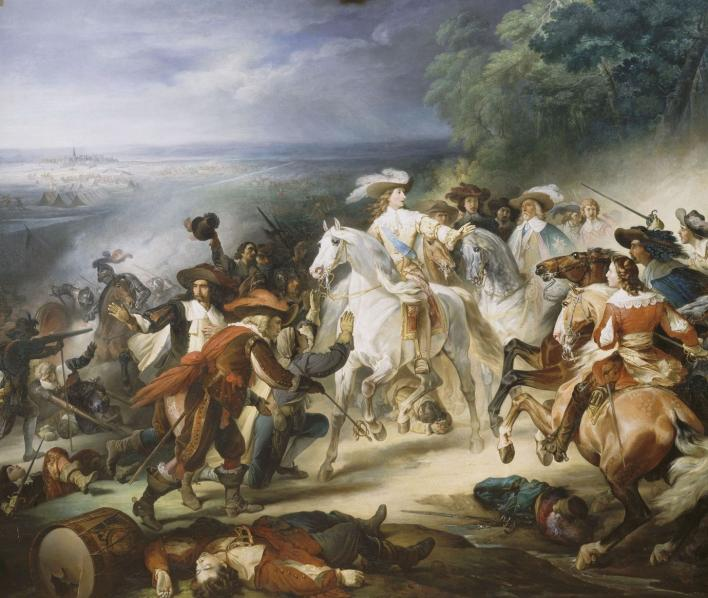
François Joseph Heim, "The Battle of Rocroi"

French losses were about 4,000. The Spanish commander Melo reported his losses at 6,000 casualties and 4,000 captured in his report to Madrid two days after the battle. The estimates for the Spanish army's dead range from 4,000 to 8,000. Of the 7,000 Spanish infantry, only 390 officers and 1,386 enlisted men were able to escape back to the Spanish Netherlands. Guthrie lists 3,400 killed and 2,000 captured for the five Spanish infantry battalions alone, while 1,600 escaped. Most of the casualties were suffered by the Spanish infantry, while the cavalry and artillerymen were able to withdraw, albeit with the loss of all the cannons.

== Aftermath and significance ==
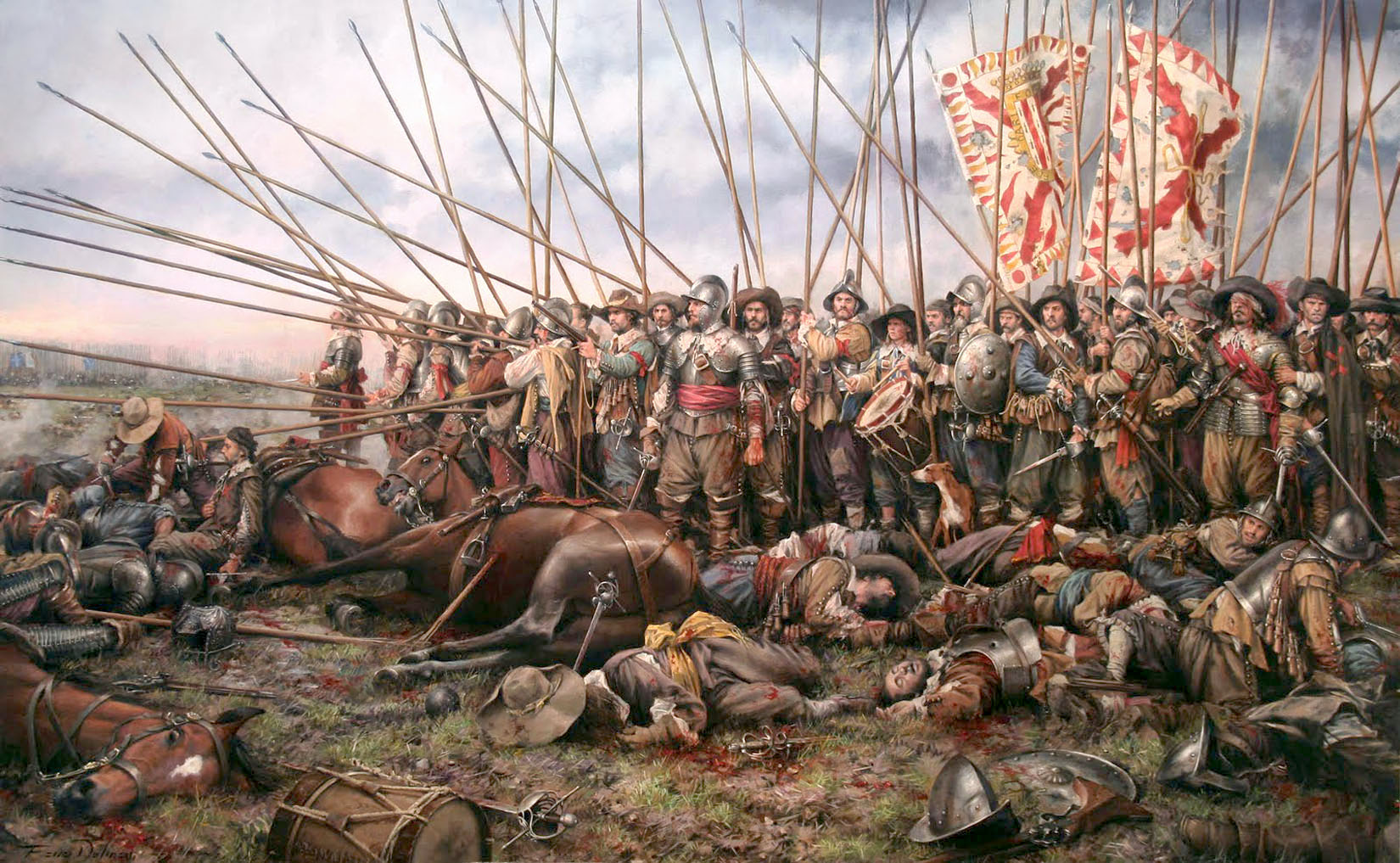
The Battle of Rocroi is often seen by historians as the end of the myth of the Spanish tercio unit's invincibility, and the rise of French cavalry. (Painting by Augusto Ferrer-Dalmaupicture)

The French lifted the Siege of Rocroi but were not strong enough to move the fight into Spanish Flanders. The Spanish regrouped rapidly and stabilized their positions.

However, the battle was of great symbolic importance because of the high reputation of the Army of Flanders.

The battle established the reputation of the 21-year-old Enghien, whose numerous victories would win him the name "the Great Condé".

Abroad, it showed that France remained strong despite its four-year-old king. The following decades would see military hegemony in Continental Europe move slowly from Spain to France, as the absolute monarchy in France overpowered the Spanish imperial power. Mazarin had maneuvered to have space to cope with the Fronde and to turn the tide slowly against the Spanish in France and in the Low Countries. Turning to alliance with England, he defeated the Spanish at the Battle of the Dunes and took Dunkirk in 1658, leading to the Treaty of the Pyrenees in 1659. Although Spain looked to be all-powerful as late as 1652, the peace settlement reflected the demise of Spain's mastery of Europe in the late 1650s.

== In media ==
A 2006 Spanish movie, Alatriste, directed by Agustín Díaz Yanes, portrays this battle in its final scene. The soundtrack features in the scene a funeral march, La Madrugá, composed by Colonel Abel Moreno for the Holy Week of Seville, played by the band of the Infantry Regiment "Soria" No. 9, the successor of the "Bloody Tercio", which participated in the battle.

== Museum ==
The elderly Spanish infantry general Paul-Bernard de Fontaines, from the Spanish Netherlands and known to the Spanish as de Fuentes, suffered from gout and was carried into battle and killed. His sedan chair was taken as a trophy by the French and may be seen in the museum of Les Invalides in Paris. Enghien is reported to have said, "Had I not won the day, I wish I had died like him".
