= Infantry Regiment "Soria" No. 9 =

Regimiento de Infantería «Soria» n.º 9
- Active: 1509 - current (514 years)
- Country: Spain
- Branch: Spanish Army
- Type: Infantry
- Size: one battalion
- Part of: Brigada «Canarias» XVI
- Garrison/HQ: Puerto del Rosario, Canary Islands
- Nickname(s): El Sangriento "The Bloody"
- Patron: Our Lady of the Immaculate Conception
- March: Marcha Regimiento Soria 9 Himno Regimiento Soria 9
- Engagements: Battle of St. Quentin (1557); Siege of Antwerp 1576; War of the Spanish Succession 1701–1714; Siege of Gibraltar 1704; Rebellion of Túpac Amaru; American Revolutionary War 1781; War of the Pyrenees 1793–1795; Battle of Vic 1810; Defence of Tortosa 1810–1811; Siege of Bilbao 1835; Siege of Morello 1838; Moroccan War 1859–1860; Battle of Trevino 1875; Spanish–American War 1898; Rif War 1920–1927; Spanish Civil War 1936–1939; Ifni War 1957–1958; War in Afghanistan

Commanders
- Notable commanders: Leopoldo O'Donnell

The Infantry Regiment "Soria" No. 9 (Spanish: Regimiento de Infantería «Soria» n.º 9) is a light infantry regiment of the Spanish Army. Founded in 1509 as a tercio, it is one of the world's oldest still operational units. Today it is garrisoned on the Canary Islands and has fought in Afghanistan.

From the late 1950s to the 1990s it was part of the "Guzman el Bueno" Division, successively the 21st and then the 2nd.

== Mission ==
- Constant preparation through training.
- Participation in exercise, maneuvers and operations.
- Cooperation with the civil authorities in emergencies.

== Organization ==
- Headquarters
- Infantry Battalion "Fuerteventura" I/9.

== History ==
The regiment was formed in Naples as a tercio in 1509, and fought as such under different names in the Italian Wars and the Eighty Years' War. Reorganized as a linear regiment in 1705 it fought in the War of the Spanish Succession, against the Peruvian insurgents, and against Revolutionary France. During the Peninsular War it fought side by side with its former British enemies against Napoleon's France. The regiment participated in the First and Third Carlist Wars, as well as the Hispano-Moroccan and the Spanish–American Wars. During the 20th century it participated in two wars in Africa, as well as the Spanish Civil War. During the 21st century it has been deployed in Afghanistan.

== Historical names of the regiment ==
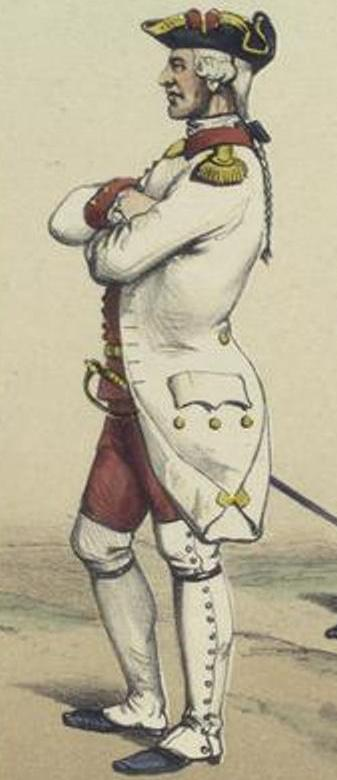
Captain of the regiment "Soria", 1768.

- 1509 Tercio de Zamudio.
- 1513 Tercio de Nápoles.
- 1591 Tercio Departamental de Brabante.
- 1700 Tercio Departamental de Brabante nº 3.
- 1705 Regimiento Departamental de Brabante nº 3.
- 1715 Regimiento de Infantería Soria nº 3.
- 1718 Regimiento de Infantería Soria nº 8.
- 1741 Regimiento de Infantería Soria nº 9.
- 1769 Regimiento de Infantería Soria nº 8.
- 1811 Regimiento de Infantería Ausona nº 8.
- 1815 Regimiento de Infantería Ausona nº 11.
- 1823 Batallones de Infantería nº 21 y nº 22.
- 1824 Regimiento de Infantería Extremadura nº8.
- 1828 Regimiento de Infantería Soria nº 8.
- 1834 Regimiento de Infantería Soria nº 9.
- 1931 Regimiento de Infantería nº 9.
- 1935 Regimiento de Infantería Granada nº 9.
- 1936 Regimiento de Infantería Granada nº 6.
- 1939 Regimiento de Infantería nº 6.
- 1944 Regimiento de Infantería Soria nº 9.
- 1959 Agrupación de Infantería Soria nº 9.
- 1963 Regimiento de Infantería Soria nº 9.
- 1965 Regimiento de Infantería Mixto Soria nº 9.
- 1996 Regimiento de Infantería Ligera “Soria nº 9”.
