= Battle of Honnecourt =

1642 battle of the Franco-Spanish War

Coordinates: 50.0375°N 3.1964°E

- Part of the Franco-Spanish War (1635–59) and the Thirty Years' War
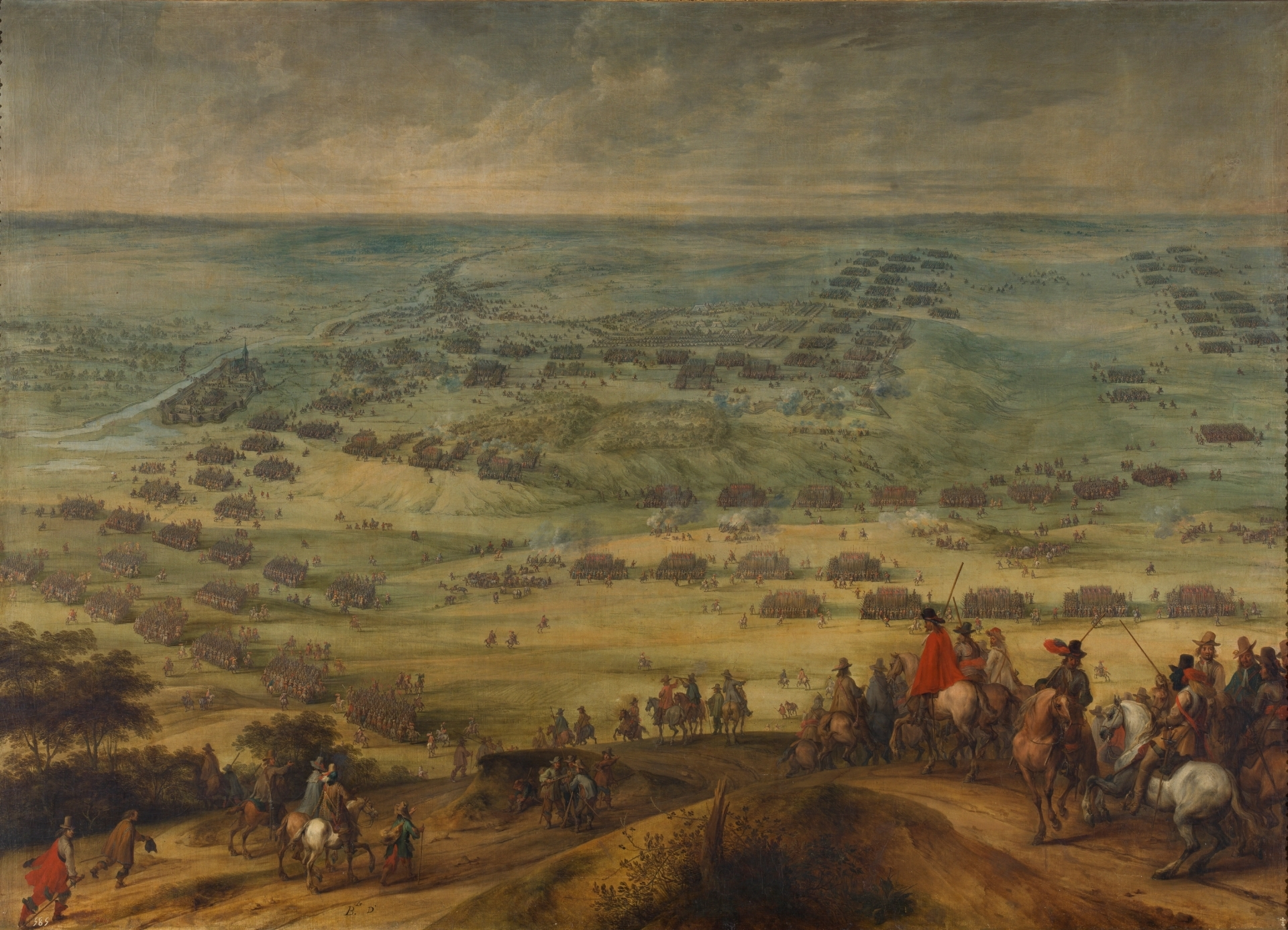
- The Battle of Honnecourt, by Peter Snayers. Perspective from the Spanish positions; note Abbey on left, and River Escaut directly behind
Date	26 May 1642
Location	Honnecourt-sur-Escaut
Result	Spanish victory

Belligerents
Spain	France

Commanders and leaders
Francisco de Melo; Jean de Beck; Count of Bucquoy; Marquis of Velada	Duke of Gramont; Josias von Rantzau (POW); Puységur-Chastenet (POW)

Strength
10,000; 20 guns	10,000; 10 guns

Casualties and losses
400–1,500 killed or wounded	4,400–6,600 killed, wounded or captured 10 guns captured

The Battle of Honnecourt took place on 26 May 1642, during the 1635 to 1659 Franco-Spanish War. A Spanish army led by Francisco de Melo defeated and largely destroyed a French force under the Comte de Guiche.

With the bulk of French forces committed to the Siege of Perpignan in Catalonia, Melo launched an offensive into Artois, then part of the Spanish Netherlands. After retaking Lens and La Bassée in early May, he moved to attack Guiche's "Army of Champagne", based near Honnecourt-sur-Escaut.

Guiche placed his troops in a strong position but they proved no match for the veteran Army of Flanders and both wings collapsed after seven hours of fighting. With their retreat blocked by the River Scheldt directly behind them and only one bridge, most of the French were either killed or captured. Guiche was one of the last to leave the battlefield and only 1,600 of his troops escaped.

One of the relatively few decisive battles in a war of attrition that lasted 24 years, the result was greeted with euphoria by the Spanish court and caused panic in Paris, which seemed open to a Spanish invasion. Instead, Melo moved to confront a Franco-Dutch offensive in the Rhineland and the battle ultimately changed little.

== Background ==
By 1642, the Franco-Spanish War was entering its seventh year, with neither side able to gain a decisive advantage. The outbreak of the Catalonian revolt in 1640 provided France an opportunity to weaken Spain and expand its southwestern frontier in Roussillon. French chief minister Cardinal Richelieu and King Louis XIII decided to make the capture of Perpignan their main objective for 1642, while remaining on the defensive elsewhere.

During the 1640 campaign, the French captured much of Artois, now in modern France, then part of the Spanish Netherlands, occupying Arras, Lens and La Bassée. Hoping to divert resources from Catalonia, Francisco de Melo, the new Governor of the Spanish Netherlands, planned an offensive to retake them, using 30,000 troops from the Army of Flanders, the most experienced formation in the Spanish Empire.

Opposing him were the French armies of Picardy, commanded by the Comte d'Harcourt, and Champagne, under the Comte de Guiche. The former consisted of 18,000 men quartered around Saint-Quentin, the latter 11,000 men based in Péronne. In early May, Melo captured Lens, then moved onto La Bassée; after combining near Arras, Guiche and Harcourt moved to its relief but hesitated to attack the strong defences constructed by the Spanish around their siege lines and withdrew. Instead, Harcourt marched into the Boulonnais to head off an attack on Calais, with Guiche based near Le Catelet to prevent the Spanish garrison of Cambrai raiding into Champagne.

== Battle ==
Battle of Honnecourt, 1642; key locations

After La Bassée surrendered on 13 May, Melo decided to attack Guiche with a detachment of 8,000 infantry and 2,000 cavalry and by 25 May, he was approaching Honnecourt-sur-Escaut. Guiche held a strong position north of Le Catelet, with his troops positioned on high ground in a line running along the edge of a steep ravine. His right flank was anchored by Honnecourt Abbey and a wooded area known as the Bois Maillard; on the left, which had fewer natural obstacles, he constructed a number of strong earthworks, still visible in the mid-19th century. The baggage train was placed directly behind the abbey, next to the only bridge across the River Scheldt, known to the French as the "Escaut".

Puységur-Chastenet, one of Guiche's three Maréchal de camps, argued they should occupy two hills on the other side of the ravine overlooking their defences and prevent their use by the Spanish artillery. Assuming they were seriously outnumbered, Josias von Rantzau and other senior officers felt this required more troops than were available, so Guiche decided to hold his current positions and await an attack. Rantzau also suggested building another bridge over the river but the French lacked the men or time to do so; both decisions played a significant role in the events that followed.

As predicted by Puységur-Chastenet, early on the morning of 26 May the Spanish placed their artillery on the two hills and began battering the French defences, concentrating their fire on the abbey. Since most of the French cavalry was stationed around the Bois Maillard, Melo was concerned they might attempt to outflank him and assigned the bulk of his forces to Jean de Beck, commander of the left wing. His infantry moved quickly through the woods, supported by Walloon cavalry under Bucquoy, catching the French in the process of forming up. The cavalry fled in disorder before Guiche rallied them and although Bucquoy was driven back three times, they pursued him too far and were exposed to fire at close range from the Spanish artillery. Having suffered heavy losses, the cavalry retreated across the River Escaut and the majority played no further part in the battle.

Meanwhile, Beck's infantry were assaulting the abbey; with their defences severely weakened by three hours of constant bombardment, the French defenders began to give ground. Velada had simultaneously attacked the French left with around 3,000 troops and although their first assault was repulsed, the second successfully over-ran the earthworks. After seven hours of fighting, the French positions on the left and right collapsed; the vast majority were either killed or captured, including the elite Compagnie de Dauphin. Guiche left the field only when persuaded to do so by Puységur-Chastenet, who was taken prisoner along with the remains of his regiment and narrowly escaped being killed by his captors in a dispute over his ransom.

In addition to nearly 4,000 prisoners of war, the French lost between 1,200 and 3,000 dead, many of whom drowned attempting to cross the river. During the retreat, a large number made a stand around a church in the nearby village of Bantouzelle; their remains were still being uncovered two centuries later. Other sources place the total French casualties at 6,600 killed or captured. The Spanish also captured the French guns and baggage train, along with 400,000 livres in cash; their own losses were between 400 and 500 killed. Most of the prisoners were later exchanged for Spanish troops captured at Rocroi in July 1643.

== Aftermath ==
In a war where both sides struggled to achieve decisive victories, Honnecourt was greeted with euphoria at the Spanish court. Guiche reached Saint-Quentin accompanied by less than 1,600 men, mostly cavalry, and since the main French army was at Perpignan with Louis XIII, the road to Paris appeared open, causing panic in the capital. Instead, Melo turned towards the North Rhineland, which had been controlled by French general Guébriant since defeating an Imperial army at Kempen in January.

Guébriant and his Franco-Weimarian troops now proposed to link up with a Dutch force under the Prince of Orange, and co-ordinate an attack on the important Spanish-held town of Geldern. Although criticised by some for being over cautious, Melo was undoubtedly correct in viewing this a greater threat. The Dutch withdrew in the face of his advance and abandoned the siege; at the end of 1642, the Spanish had retaken most of northern Artois and their position in Flanders appeared as strong as ever.

== Sources ==
- Bodart, Gaston (1908). Militar-Historisches Kriegs-Lexikon V1: 1618-1905 (in German) (2010 ed.). Kessinger Publishing. ISBN 978-1167991554.
- Boniface, Louis (1859). Notice sur Aubencheul-au-Bois et les hameaux voisins (in French). Imprimerie de Alexandre Régnier-Farez.
- Clodfelter, Micheal (2017). Warfare and Armed Conflicts: A Statistical Encyclopedia of Casualty and Other Figures, 1492-2015 (4 ed.). McFarland & Company. ISBN 978-0786474707.
- De Périni, Hardÿ (1898). Batailles françaises, 1621 to 1643 Volume III (in French). Ernest Flammarion.
- Guthrie, William P. (2003). The Later Thirty Years War: From the Battle of Wittstock to the Treaty of Westphalia. Greenwood Press. ISBN 0-313-32408-5.
- Kamen, Henry (2002). Spain's Road to Empire (2003 ed.). Allen Lane. ISBN 978-0140285284.
- Parrott, David (2001). Richelieu's Army: War, Government and Society in France, 1624–1642. Cambridge University Press. ISBN 978-0521792097.
- Puységur-Chastenet, Jacques de (1690). Les memoires de messire Jacques de Chastenet. Wolfgang Abraham.
- Stradling, R. A. (1994). Spain's struggle for Europe, 1598-1668. Bloomsbury Academic.
- Wilson, Peter H. (2009). Europe's Tragedy: A History of the Thirty Years War. Allen Lane. ISBN 978-0-7139-9592-3.
