= Paul-Bernard de Fontaines =

Spanish commander

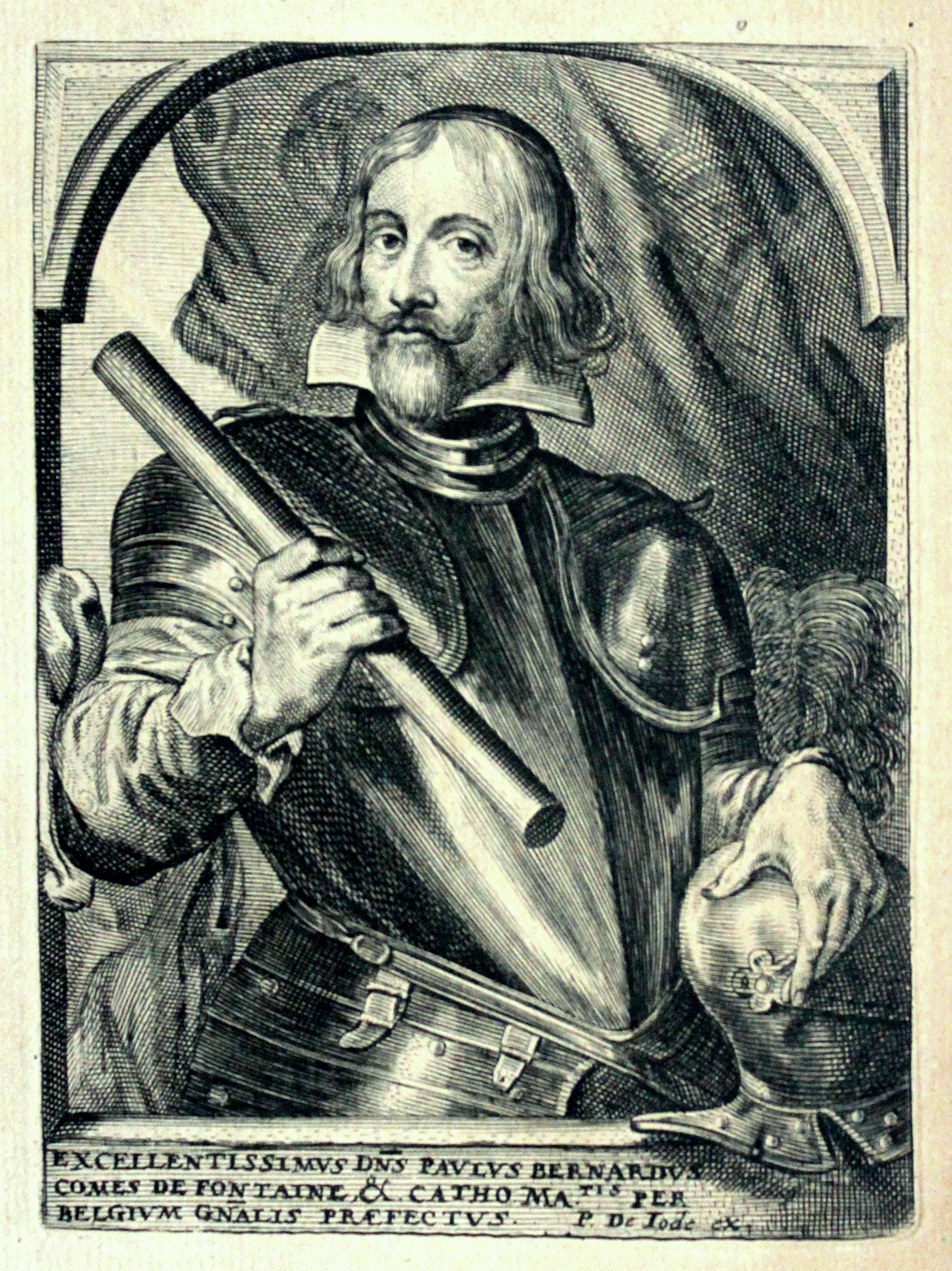
- Born: 1566
- Died: 19 May 1643 (aged 77 or 76); Killed at the Battle of Rocroi
- Military career
- Allegiance: Spain
- Branch: (Spanish Empire) Spanish Army
- Service years: 1596–1643
- Rank: Maestre de campo
- Conflicts: Eighty Years' War; Thirty Years' War: Battle of Rocroi †

Paul-Bernard de Fontaines (1566, Lorraine – 19 May 1643, Rocroi), also known as Comtefontaine, Conde Fontana or Fuentes, was commander of the Spanish infantry during the Eighty Years War. He was Bailiff of Bruges and Governor of Damme. He participated in the battles around Hulst, Kallo and Antwerp.

== Life ==
Paul-Bernard de Fontaine was the son of Francisco de Fontaine, Lord of Cierges, rider-chief, governor of Stenay, administrator of the Duke of Lorraine, and Suzanne d'Urre. Both died before Fontaine had finished his first year. His maternal grandfather, Jean d'Urre, master of Thessières, took care of him until, in 1584, he resigned his guardianship, he was 87 years old and died two years later, and gave it to his oldest son Charles.

In 1596, he joined the King of Spain as a volunteer, and subsequently made a military career. In 1597, he was Captain of the infantry; in 1604, captain of the cavalry, in 1611, he became military commander in Flanders. When the twelve-year armistice ended in 1621, he built fortresses from Knokke to Lapscheure, later known as the Fontaine line. In 1631, as commander of the Spanish troops, he broke through the siege of Bruges by Frederick Henry, Prince of Orange. In the course of his career, Fontaine appeared more as an efficient administrator than as a military strategist.

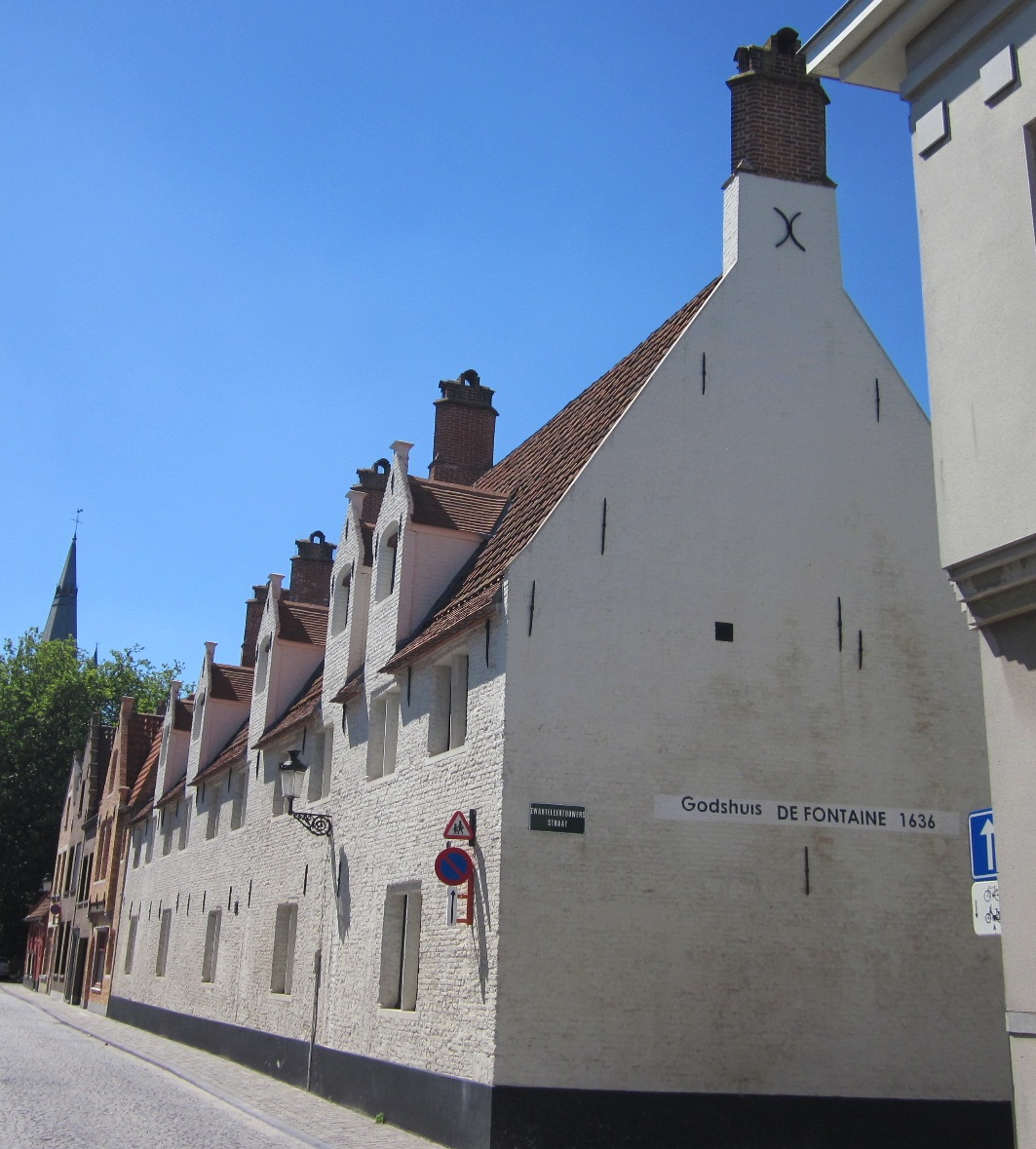
Almshouse "Godshuis DE FONTAINE", Zwarteleertouwersstraat, Bruges

In 1636, together with his wife, Anna de Ragicourt, he founded a chapel and almshouse in the Zwarteleertouwersstraat in Bruges for twelve impoverished soldiers. His coat of arms is placed over the door in the side wall. The building was used until 1914 according to the foundations and is now a monument. At the St. Walburga church at Bruges he donated a main altar bearing his coat of arms.

In 1638, he was appointed the Maestre de campo (Commander of the Infantry). At this time, he was already chronically ill and barely capable of military service.
At the Battle of Rocroi in 1643, he commanded his Tercios from a sedan chair before he was killed and was later buried in the monastery church of the Order of Friars Minor. (The monastery and church were demolished in 1796.)
