= Francisco de Melo =

16th/17th-century Portugues nobleman, general of the Spanish Empire

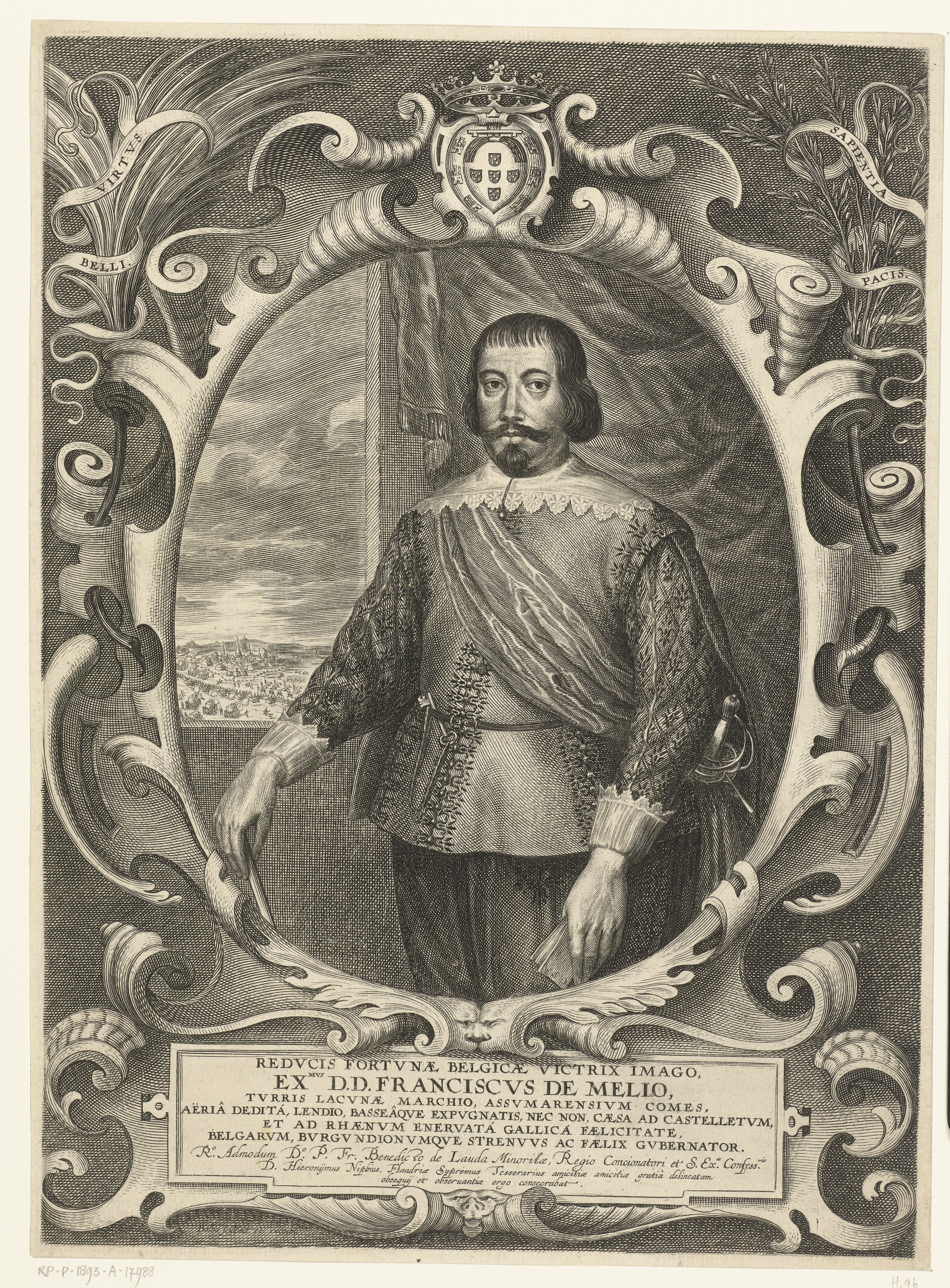
- Francisco de Melo as Governor of the Spanish Netherlands.
- Born: 1597; Estremoz, Portugal
- Died: 18 December 1651 (aged 53–54); Madrid, Spain
- Military career
- Allegiance: Spain
- Branch: (Spanish Empire) Spanish Army
- Service years: 1638–1645
- Rank: Captain General
- Conflicts: Thirty Years' War; Catalan Revolt

Dom Francisco de Melo (1597 – 18 December 1651) was a Portuguese nobleman who served as a Spanish general during the Thirty Years' War.

== Biography ==
Francisco was born in Estremoz, Portugal. From 1632 to 1636 he was the Spanish ambassador to the Republic of Genoa. In 1638, Francisco was appointed viceroy of Sicily, and two years later he was ambassador in Vienna. He was appointed as an understudy of Marquess of Leganés.

Francisco was marquis of the Portuguese Tor de Laguna, count of Assumar, and from 1641 to 1644, interim governor of the Southern Netherlands.

When Francisco arrived in the Southern Netherlands, he already had an impressive political career. He scored a victory against Antoine III de Gramont at the Battle of Honnecourt in May 1642.

Francisco was defeated at the Battle of Rocroi in 1643. (Note: Parker states, incorrectly, that Francisco was recalled in disgrace following his loss at Rocroi.) In August 1644, Francisco returned to Spain and was appointed to the council of state and royal military adviser by Philip IV of Spain.

== Sources ==
- Guthrie, William P. (2003). The Later Thirty Years War: From the Battle of Wittstock to the Treaty of Westphalia. Greenwood Press.
- Hanlon, Gregory (2016). Italy 1636: Cemetery of Armies. Oxford University Press.
- van Nimwegen, Olaf (2010). The Dutch Army and the Military Revolutions, 1588-1688. The Boydell Press.
- Stradling, R. A. (1994). Spain's struggle for Europe, 1598-1668. Bloomsbury Academic.
- Watanabe-O'Kelly, Helen (2010). Europa Triumphans: Court and Civic Festivals in Early Modern Europe. Ashgate Publishing.

Government offices
Preceded by Cardinal-Infante Ferdinand	Governor-General of the Spanish Netherlands; 1641–1644	Succeeded by Marquis of Castel Rodrigo
Preceded by Luis Guillermo de Moncada, 7th Duke of Montalto	Viceroy of Sicily; 1639–1641	Succeeded by Juan Alfonso Enríquez de Cabrera
