= Charles V, Holy Roman Emperor =

Holy Roman Emperor from 1519 to 1556

Charles V
- Imperator Romanorum
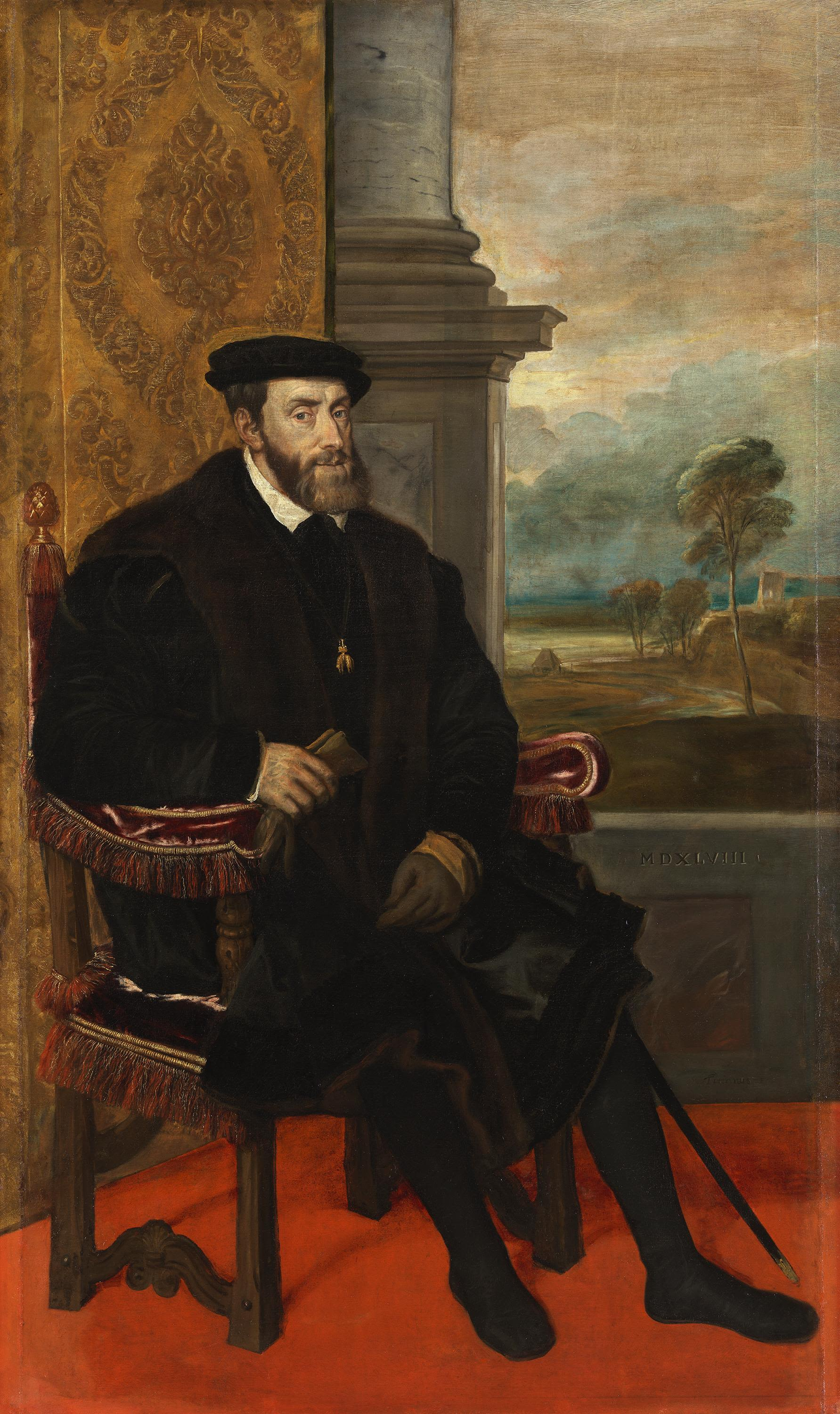
- Portrait of Charles V, 1548

Holy Roman Emperor as Charles V
- Reign: 28 June 1519 – 3 August 1556/24 February 1558 (Note: The chronology of his abdications has been disputed since early scholarship. His public abdication to the States General of the Netherlands certainly took place on 25 October 1555. His abdication as Spanish king is generally dated to 16 January 1556, although some give other dates. This was ratified in a document dated 17 February. On 3 August, he announced his abdication as emperor and instructed his commissioners to negotiate with Ferdinand and the electors the formal transfer of power. On 27 August, Charles wrote a document to the Imperial court in Speyer (referred to as a Constitutio or Rescriptum) renouncing the Empire in favour of Ferdinand. Then, on 7 September, he sent an edict to all States of the Empire, urging them to recognise Ferdinand as their new ruler. The abdication was not recognized by the electors until 24 (or 28) February 1558. Ferdinand was finally proclaimed and crowned Emperor-elect on 14 March, after swearing the Electoral capitulation.)
- Coronation: 23 October 1520 (Germany); 22 February 1530 (Italy); 24 February 1530 (Empire)
- Predecessor: Maximilian I
- Successor: Ferdinand I

King of Spain as Charles I
- Reign: 14 March 1516 – 16 January 1556
- Predecessor: Joanna of Castile
- Successor: Philip II
- Co-monarch: Joanna I (until 1555)
- Regents: See list: Adrian, Cardinal-Bishop of Tortosa; Isabella, Holy Roman Empress; Philip, Prince of Asturias; Archduke Maximilian of Austria; Infanta Maria of Spain

Archduke of Austria as Charles I
- Reign: 12 January 1519 – 21 April 1521/3 August 1556 (Note: Ferdinand became Archduke of Austria and was entrusted with the Austrian lands by virtue of the pacts of Worms (1521) and Brussels (1522) he made with his brother. However, Charles V also continued to style himself as Archduke of Austria and Ferdinand ruled in the name of his brother until the Imperial abdication.)
- Predecessor: Maximilian I
- Successor: Ferdinand I

Lord of the Netherlands, Count Palatine of Burgundy, and titular Duke of Burgundy (as Charles II)
- Reign: 25 September 1506 – 25 October 1555
- Predecessor: Philip the Handsome
- Successor: Philip II of Spain
- Governors: See list: Margaret of Austria; Mary of Austria
- Born: 24 February 1500; Prinsenhof, Ghent, Flanders
- Died: 21 September 1558 (aged 58); Monastery of Yuste, Castile
- Burial: El Escorial, Spain
- Spouse: Isabella of Portugal (m. 1526; died 1539)
- Issue more...: Philip II, King of Spain; Maria, Holy Roman Empress; Joanna, Princess of Portugal; Illegitimate: Margaret, Duchess of Florence and Parma; John, Governor of the Netherlands
- House: Habsburg
- Father: Philip the Handsome
- Mother: Joanna, Queen of Castile and Aragon
- Religion: Catholic Church

Charles V (Note: German: Karl V.; Spanish: Carlos V; French: Charles V; Italian: Carlo V; Dutch: Karel V; Catalan: Carles V; Latin: Carolus V) (Note: Charles V as Holy Roman Emperor; Charles I as King of Spain and Archduke of Austria; Charles II as Duke of Burgundy.) (24 February 1500 – 21 September 1558) was Holy Roman Emperor and Archduke of Austria from 1519 to 1556, King of Spain (as Charles I) from 1516 to 1556, King of Sicily and Naples from 1516 to 1554, and also Lord of the Netherlands and titular Duke of Burgundy (as Charles II) from 1506 to 1555. He was heir to and then head of the rising House of Habsburg. His dominions in Europe included the Holy Roman Empire, extending from Germany to northern Italy with rule over the Austrian hereditary lands and Burgundian Low Countries, and Spain with its possessions of the southern Italian kingdoms of Sicily, Naples, and Sardinia. In the Americas, he oversaw the continuation of Spanish colonisation and a short-lived German colonisation. The personal union of the European and American territories he ruled was the first collection of realms labelled "the empire on which the sun never sets".

Charles was born in Flanders to Habsburg Archduke Philip the Handsome, son of Maximilian I, Holy Roman Emperor and Mary of Burgundy, and Joanna of Castile, third child of Isabella I of Castile and Ferdinand II of Aragon, the Catholic Monarchs of Spain. Heir of his grandparents, Charles inherited his family's dominions at a young age. After his father's death in 1506, he inherited the Habsburg Netherlands in the Low Countries. In 1516, he became King of Spain as co-monarch of Castile and Aragon with his mother. Spain's possessions included the Castilian colonies of the Spanish West Indies and the Spanish Main, as well as Naples, Sicily and Sardinia. At the death of his paternal grandfather Maximilian in 1519, he inherited the Austrian hereditary lands and was elected as Holy Roman Emperor. He adopted the Imperial name of Charles V as his main title, and styled himself as a new Charlemagne.

Charles revitalised the medieval concept of universal monarchy. With no fixed capital, he made 40 journeys through the different entities he ruled and spent a quarter of his reign travelling within his realms. Although his empire came to him peacefully, he spent most of his life waging war, exhausting his revenues and leaving debts in his attempt to defend the integrity of the Holy Roman Empire from the Protestant Reformation, the expansion of the Ottoman Empire, and in wars with France. Charles borrowed money from German and Italian bankers and, to repay them, relied on the wealth of the Low Countries and the flow of silver from New Spain and Peru, brought under his rule following the Spanish conquest of the Aztec and Inca empires, which caused widespread inflation. He supported the Magellan expedition, which resulted in the first circumnavigation of the world.

Crowned King of Germany in Aachen, Charles sided with Pope Leo X and declared Martin Luther an outlaw at the Diet of Worms in 1521. The same year, Francis I of France, surrounded by the Habsburg possessions, started a war in Italy that led to his capture in the Battle of Pavia (1525). In 1527, Rome was sacked by an army of Charles's mutinous soldiers. Charles then defended Vienna from the Ottoman Turks and obtained coronations as King of Italy and Holy Roman Emperor from Pope Clement VII. In 1535, he took possession of Milan and captured Tunis. However, the loss of Buda during the struggle for Hungary and the Algiers expedition in the early 1540s frustrated his anti-Ottoman policies. After years of negotiations, Charles came to an agreement with Pope Paul III for the organisation of the Council of Trent (1545). The refusal of the Lutheran Schmalkaldic League to recognise the council's validity led to a war, won by Charles. However, Henry II of France offered new support to the Lutheran cause and strengthened the Franco-Ottoman alliance with Suleiman the Magnificent.

Ultimately, Charles conceded the Peace of Augsburg and abandoned his multi-national project with abdications in 1556 that divided his hereditary and imperial domains between the Spanish Habsburgs, headed by his son Philip II of Spain, and the Austrian Habsburgs, headed by his brother Ferdinand. In 1557, Charles retired to the Monastery of Yuste in Extremadura and died there a year later.

== Ancestry ==
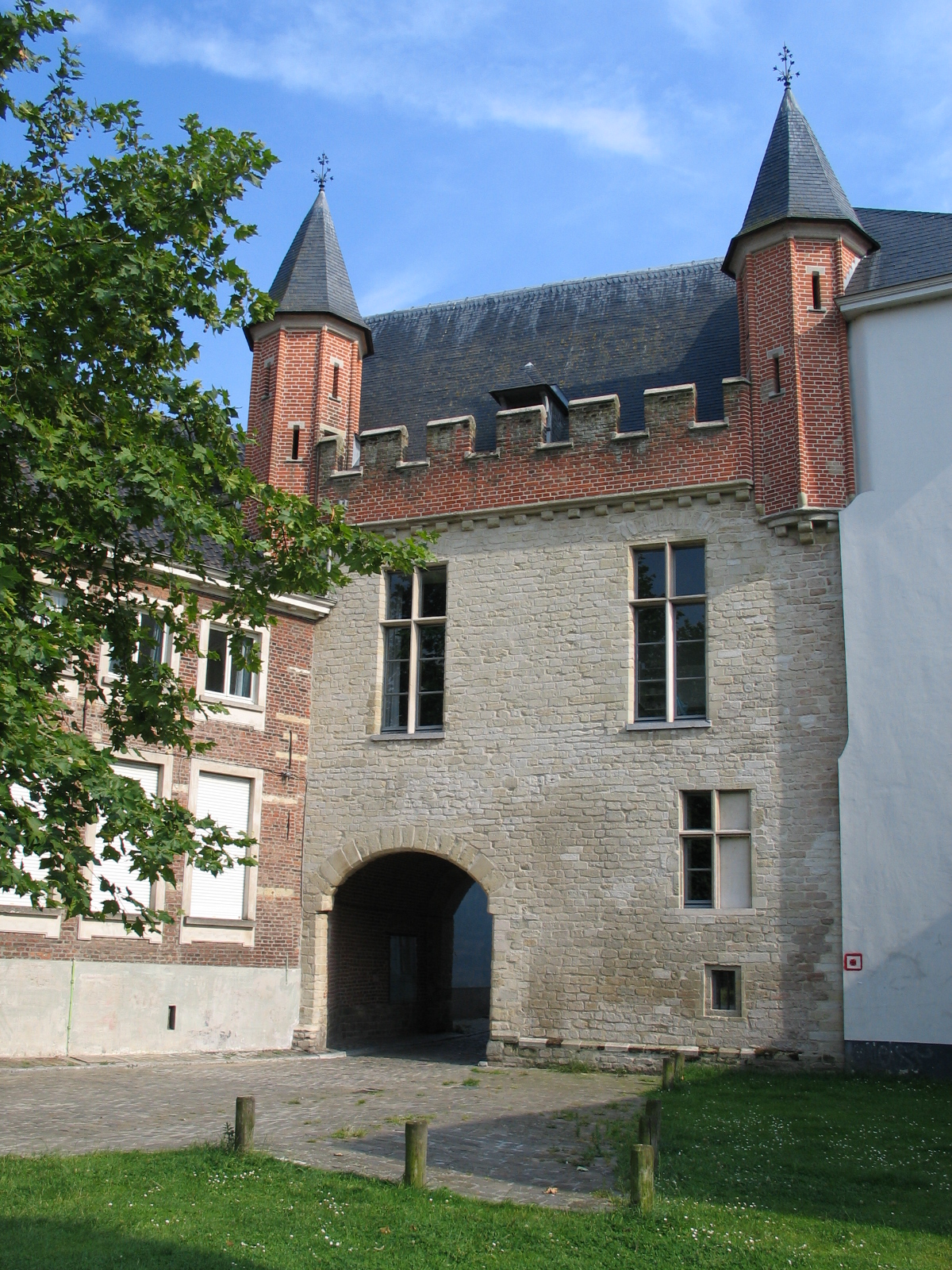
The entrance gate to the Prinsenhof, Dutch for "Princes' Court", in Ghent, where Charles V was born.

Charles of Austria was born on 24 February 1500 in the Prinsenhof of Ghent, a Flemish city of the Habsburg Netherlands, to Philip the Handsome and Joanna of Trastámara. His father Philip, nicknamed Philip the Handsome, was the firstborn son of Maximilian I, Holy Roman Emperor, Archduke of Austria, and Mary of Burgundy, heiress to the Burgundian Netherlands. Charles's mother Joanna of Castile was a younger daughter of Ferdinand II of Aragon and Isabella I of Castile, the Catholic Monarchs of Spain from the House of Trastámara. The political marriage of Philip and Joanna was first conceived in a letter sent by Maximilian to Ferdinand, part of the establishment of an Austro-Spanish alliance opposed to the Kingdom of France in the context of the Italian Wars.

From the moment he became King of the Romans in 1486, Charles's paternal grandfather Maximilian had carried a very financially risky policy of maximum expansionism, relying mostly on the resources of the Austrian hereditary lands. Even though it is often implied by, among others, Erasmus of Rotterdam, that Charles V and the Habsburgs gained their vast empire through peaceful policies (exemplified by the saying Bella gerant aliī, tū fēlix Austria nūbe / Nam quae Mars aliīs, dat tibi regna Venus or "Let others wage war, but thou, O happy Austria, marry; for those kingdoms which Mars gives to others, Venus gives to thee", reportedly spoken by Mathias Corvinus), Maximilian and his descendants fought wars aplenty. Maximilian fought 27 wars during his four decades of ruling.

His general strategy was to combine his intricate systems of alliance, wars, military threats and offers of marriage to realise his expansionist ambitions. Ultimately, he succeeded in coercing Bohemia, Hungary and Poland into acquiescence in the Habsburgs' expansionist plan.

The fact that the marriages between the Habsburgs and the Trastámaras, originally conceived as a marital alliance against France, would bring the crowns of Castile and Aragon to Maximilian's male line was unexpected.

The marriage contract between Philip and Joanna was signed in 1495, and celebrations were held in 1496. Philip was already Duke of Burgundy given Mary's death in 1482 (although the Duchy of Burgundy itself had been lost to the French crown). He was also heir apparent of Austria as an honorific archduke. Joanna, in contrast, was only third in the Spanish line of succession, preceded by her older brother John, Prince of Asturias and older sister Isabella of Aragon. Both heirs to the crowns of Castile and Aragon, John and Isabella, died in 1498. The Catholic Monarchs desired to keep the Spanish kingdoms in Iberian hands, so they designated their Portuguese grandson Miguel da Paz as heir presumptive of Spain by naming him Prince of Asturias; but he died as a baby in 1500.

Ancestors of Charles V, Holy Roman Emperor

4. Maximilian I, Holy Roman Emperor; Archduke of Austria (1493); Holy Roman Emperor (1508)
2. Philip I of Castile; Duke of Burgundy (1482); King of Castile (1506)
5. Mary of Burgundy; Duchess of Burgundy (1477)
1. Charles of Habsburg; Holy Roman Emperor (1519); Archduke of Austria (1519); King of Castile (1516); King of Aragon (1516); Duke of Burgundy (1506)
6. Ferdinand II of Aragon; King of Aragon (1479)
3. Joanna, Queen of Castile; Queen of Castile (1504); Queen of Aragon (1516)
7. Isabella I of Castile; Queen of Castile (1474)

== Birth and childhood ==
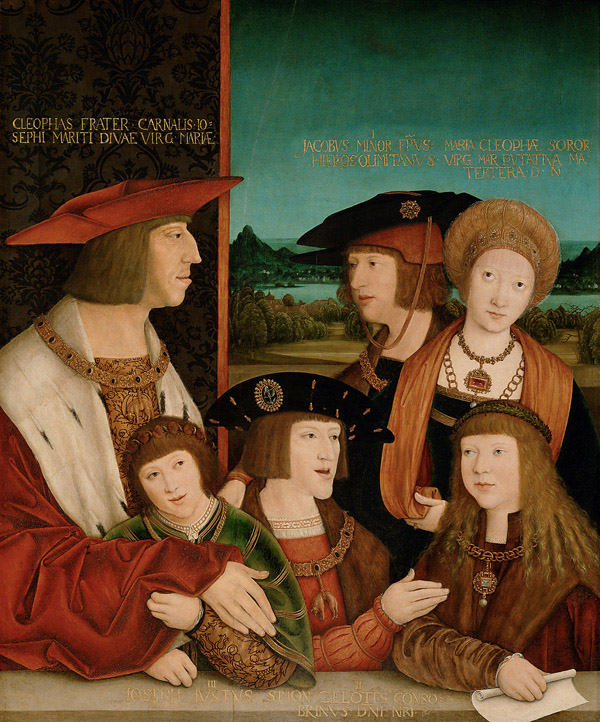
A painting by Bernhard Strigel representing the extended Habsburg family with a young Charles in the middle

Charles's mother went into labour at a ball in February 1500. He was named in honour of Charles the Bold of Burgundy, who had attempted to create a continuous Burgundian State stretching from the North Sea to Savoy. When Charles was born, a poet at the court reported that the people of Ghent "shouted Austria and Burgundy throughout the whole city for three hours" to celebrate his birth.

Given the dynastic situation, the newborn was originally heir apparent only of the Habsburg Netherlands, being given the honorary title Duke of Luxembourg. He was also second in line to the Austrian duchies, becoming known in his early years simply as "Charles of Ghent". He was baptised at the Church of Saint John by the Bishop of Tournai. The Burgundian nobles Charles I de Croÿ and John III of Glymes were his godfathers, and Margaret of York and Margaret of Austria, Duchess of Savoy, respectively, his step-great-grandmother and aunt, his godmothers. Charles's baptism gifts were a sword and a helmet, objects of Burgundian chivalric tradition representing, respectively, the instrument of war and the symbol of peace. The death in July 1500 of the young heir presumptive Miguel de Paz to the Iberian realms of his maternal grandparents meant baby Charles's future inheritance potentially expanded to include Castile, Aragon, and the overseas possessions in the Americas.

In 1501, his parents, Philip and Joanna, left Charles in the care of Philip's step-grandmother, Margaret of York, in Mechelen and went to Spain. The main goal of their Spanish mission was the recognition of Joanna as Princess of Asturias, following Prince Miguel's death a year earlier. They succeeded despite facing some opposition from the Castilian Cortes, which were reluctant to create the premises for Habsburg succession. In 1504, when her mother Isabella died, Joanna became Queen of Castile. Charles only met his father again in 1503 while his mother returned in 1504 (after giving birth to Ferdinand in Spain). The Spanish Ambassador Gutierre Gómez de Fuensalida reported that Philip often visited and they had lots of fun. The couple's unhappy marriage and Joanna's unstable mental state, however, created many difficulties, making it unsafe for the children to stay with the parents.

Philip was recognised as King of Castile in 1506. He died shortly after, an event that was said to drive the mentally unstable Joanna into complete insanity. She was retired in isolation to the Royal Palace of Tordesillas. Charles's grandfather Ferdinand took control of all the Spanish kingdoms, under the pretext of protecting Charles's rights, which in reality he wanted to elude. Ferdinand's new marriage with Germaine de Foix failed to produce a surviving Trastámara heir to the throne, so Charles remained the heir presumptive to the Iberian realms. With his father dead and his mother confined, Charles became Duke of Burgundy and was recognised as Prince of Asturias (heir presumptive of Castile) and honorific Archduke (heir apparent of Austria).

In 1515, Charles V signed the Treaty of Paris (1515) with Francis I of France, promising that he would marry Renée of France in hopes of cementing an alliance between France and Spain. This alliance would ultimately fall through, and the marriage never took place.

== Inheritances ==
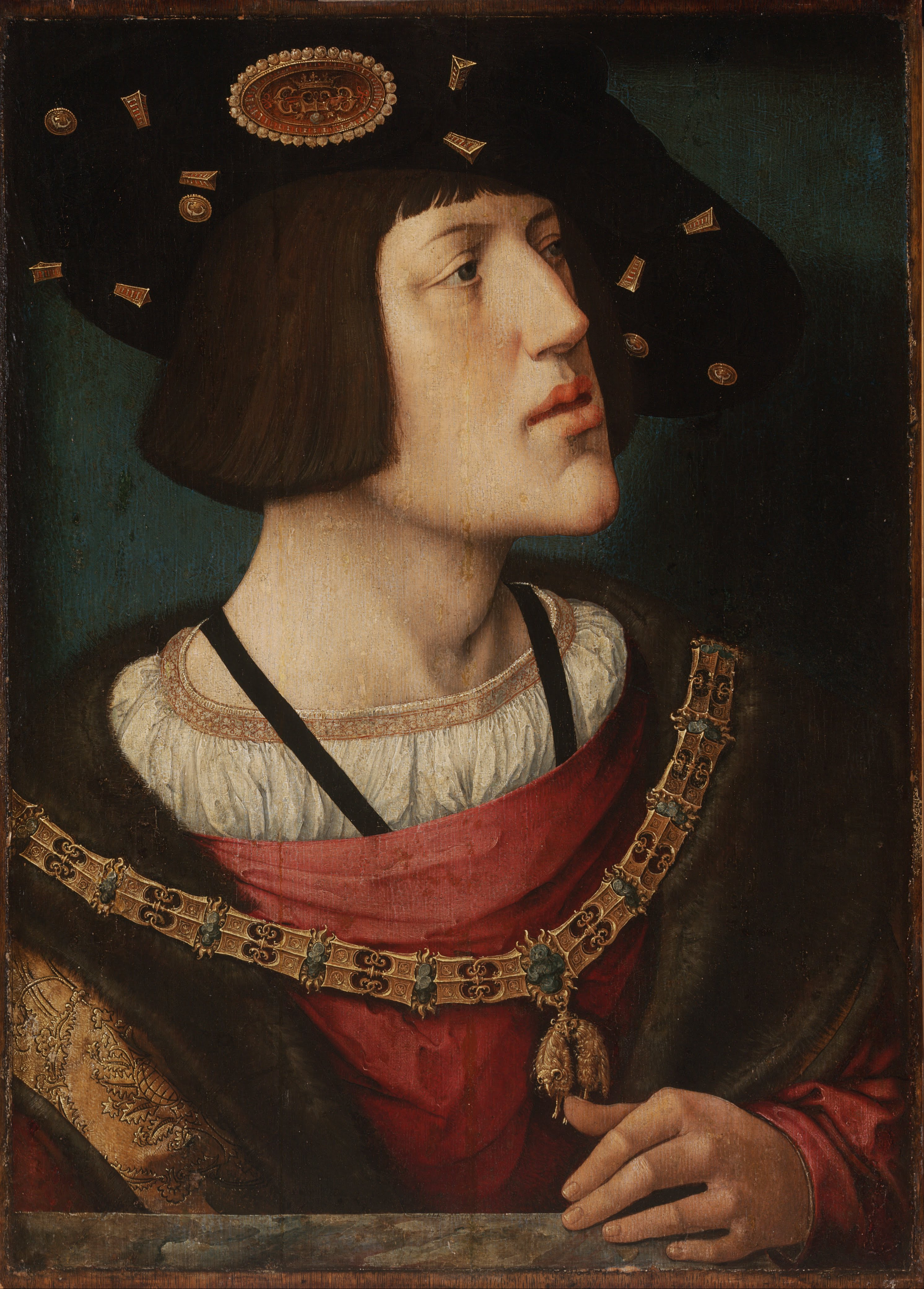
A 1519 portrait of Charles V by Bernard van Orley with the insignia of the Order of the Golden Fleece prominently displayed

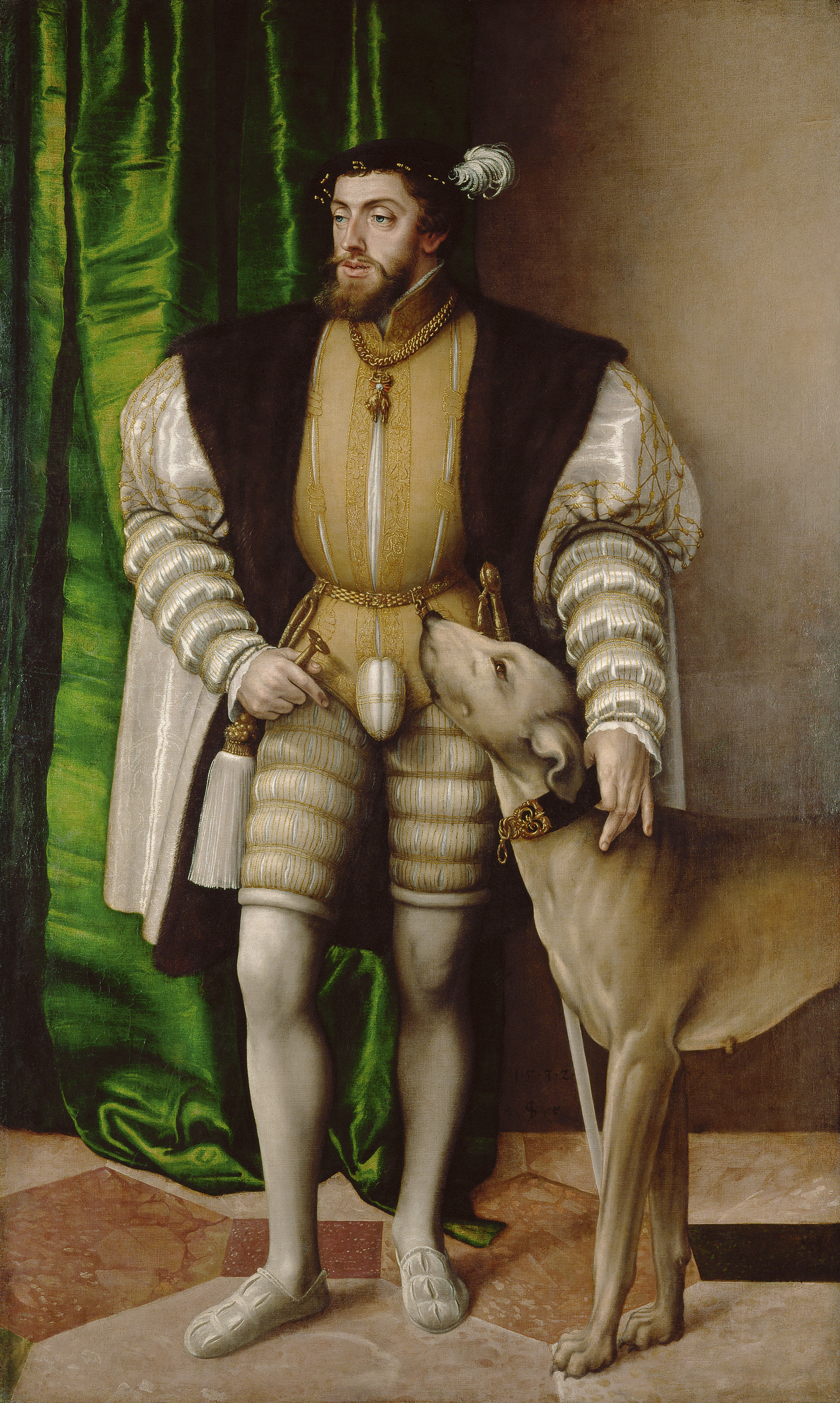
Portrait of Charles V with a Dog, a 1532 portrait by Jakob Seisenegger

The Burgundian inheritance included the Habsburg Netherlands, which consisted of a large number of lordships in the Low Countries and covered modern-day Belgium, Netherlands and Luxembourg. It also included the Free County of Burgundy (the region of Franche-Comté) and the County of Charolais, but excluded the Duchy of Burgundy, annexed by France in 1477. At the death of Philip in 1506, Charles was recognised as Lord of the Netherlands and count of Burgundy and Charolais, also becoming the titular Duke of Burgundy, and thus being styled as Duke Charles II of Burgundy.

During his childhood and teen years, Charles lived in Mechelen together with his sisters Mary, Eleanor and Isabella at the court of his aunt Margaret of Austria, Duchess of Savoy. William de Croÿ (later prime minister) and Adrian of Utrecht (later Pope Adrian VI) served as his tutors. The culture and courtly life of the Low Countries played an important part in the development of Charles's beliefs. As a member of the Burgundian Order of the Golden Fleece in his infancy, and later its grandmaster, Charles was educated in the ideals of the medieval knights and the desire for Christian unity to fight the infidel. The Low Countries were very rich during his reign, both economically and culturally. Charles was very attached to his homeland and spent a large part of his life in Brussels and Flemish cities.

The Spanish inheritance, resulting from a dynastic union of the crowns of Castile and Aragon, included Spain and the Castilian possessions in the Americas (the Spanish West Indies and the Province of Tierra Firme) and the Aragonese kingdoms of Naples, Sicily, and Sardinia. Joanna inherited these territories in 1516 while confined, allegedly because she was mentally ill. Charles, therefore, claimed the crowns for himself jure matris, thus becoming co-monarch with Joanna with the title of Charles I of Castile and Aragon or Charles I of Spain.

Castile and Aragon together formed the largest of Charles's personal possessions. They provided a great number of generals and tercios, the formidable Spanish infantry of the time, while Joanna remained confined in Tordesillas until her death. Plus Ultra, the rendition from French into Latin of Charles's personal motto "Plus Oultre" (Further Beyond), later became the national motto of Spain and features on the country's flag as part of the Spanish coat of arms since the 18th century. However, at his accession to the Iberian thrones, Charles was viewed as a foreign prince.

Two rebellions, the Revolt of the Brotherhoods and the Revolt of the Comuneros, contested Charles's rule in the 1520s. Following these revolts, Charles placed Spanish counsellors in a position of power and spent a significant part of his life in Castile, including his final years in a monastery. His son and heir, later Philip II of Spain, was born and raised in Castile. Nonetheless, many Spaniards believed that their resources, largely consisting of flows of silver from the Americas, were being used to sustain Imperial-Habsburg policies that were not in Spain's interest.

Charles inherited the Austrian hereditary lands in 1519, as Charles I of Austria, and obtained the election as Holy Roman Emperor against the candidacy of the French king. Since the Imperial election, he was known as Emperor Charles V even outside of Germany. The dynastic motto of the House of Habsburg used by Charles was A.E.I.O.U. ("Austria Est Imperare Orbi Universo" — "it is Austria's destiny to rule the world"; although its exact meaning remains disputed). Charles staunchly defended Catholicism as Lutheranism spread. Various German princes broke with him on religious grounds, fighting against him. Charles's presence in Germany was often marked by the organization of imperial diets to maintain religious and political unity.

He was frequently in Northern Italy, often taking part in complicated negotiations with the Popes to address the rise of Protestantism. The German Catholics supported the Emperor. Charles had a close relationship with important German families, like the House of Nassau, many of which were represented at his imperial court. Many German princes, noblemen and generals led his military campaigns against France and the Ottomans or accompanied him in his travels, and the bulk of his army was generally composed of German troops, especially the Imperial Landsknechte.

== Reign ==
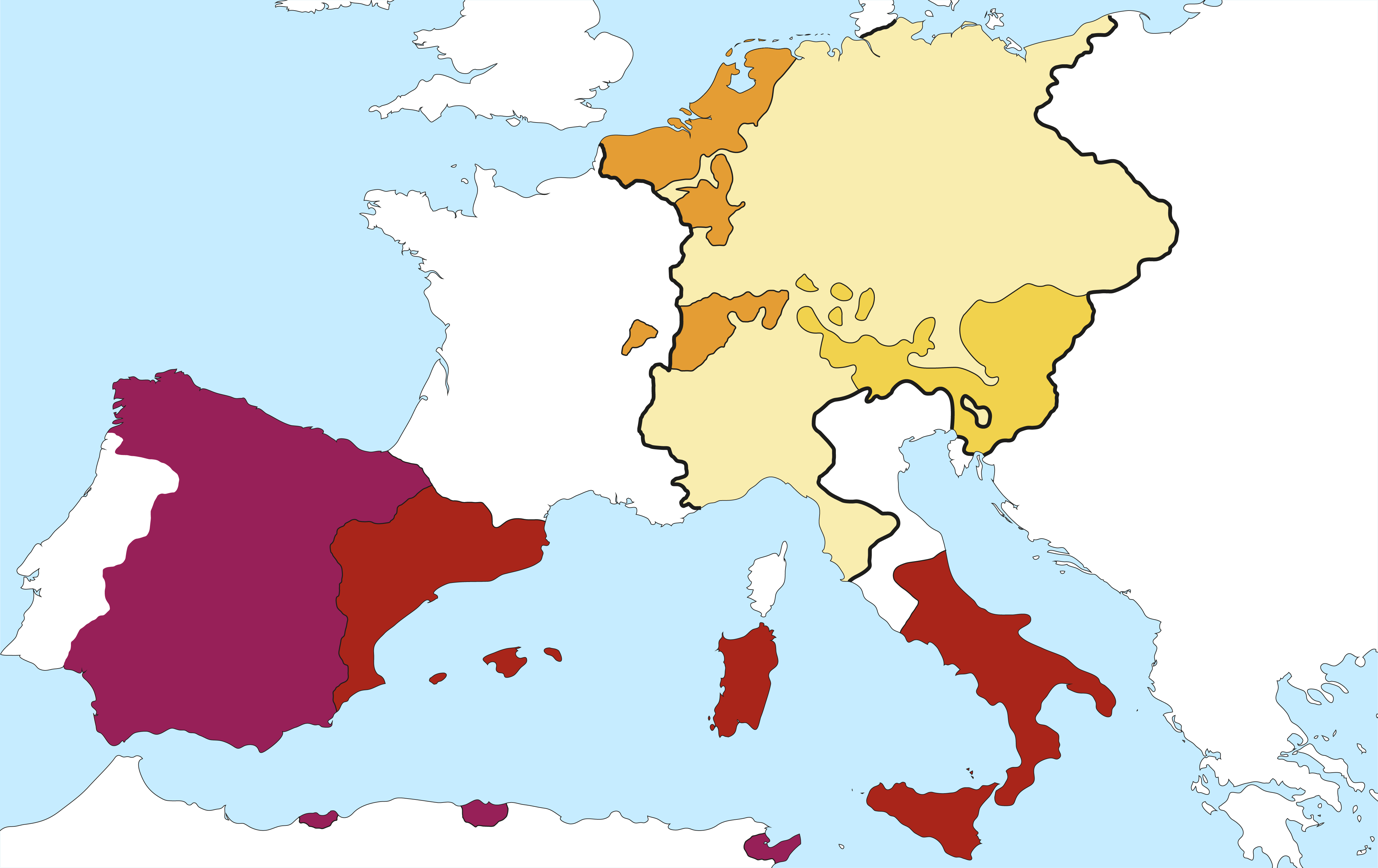
The dominions of the Habsburgs at the time of the abdication of Charles V in 1556

=== Burgundy and the Low Countries ===
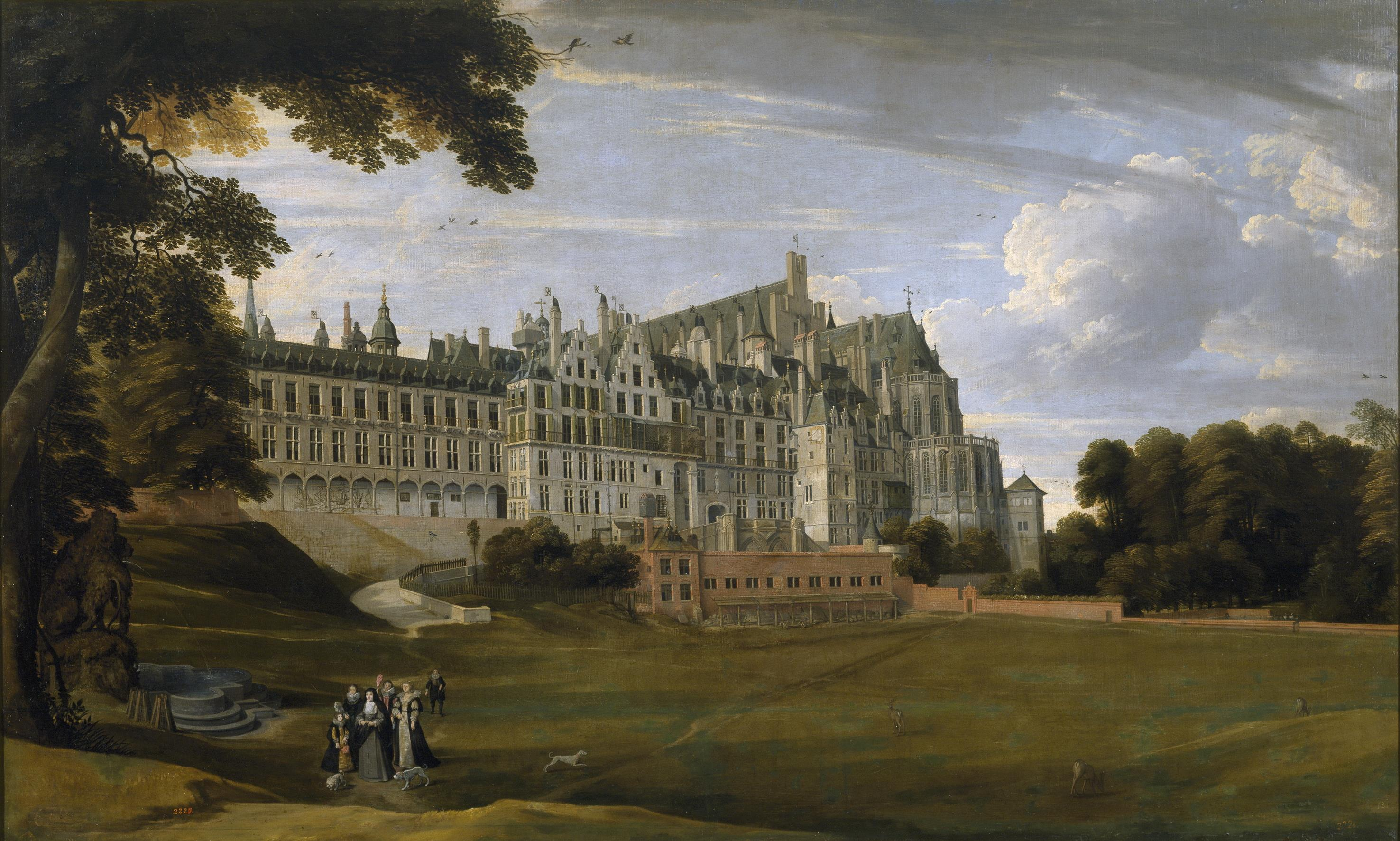
The Palace of Coudenberg in Brussels from a 17th century portrait before it burnt down in 1731. Brussels served as the main seat of the imperial court of Charles V in the Low Countries.

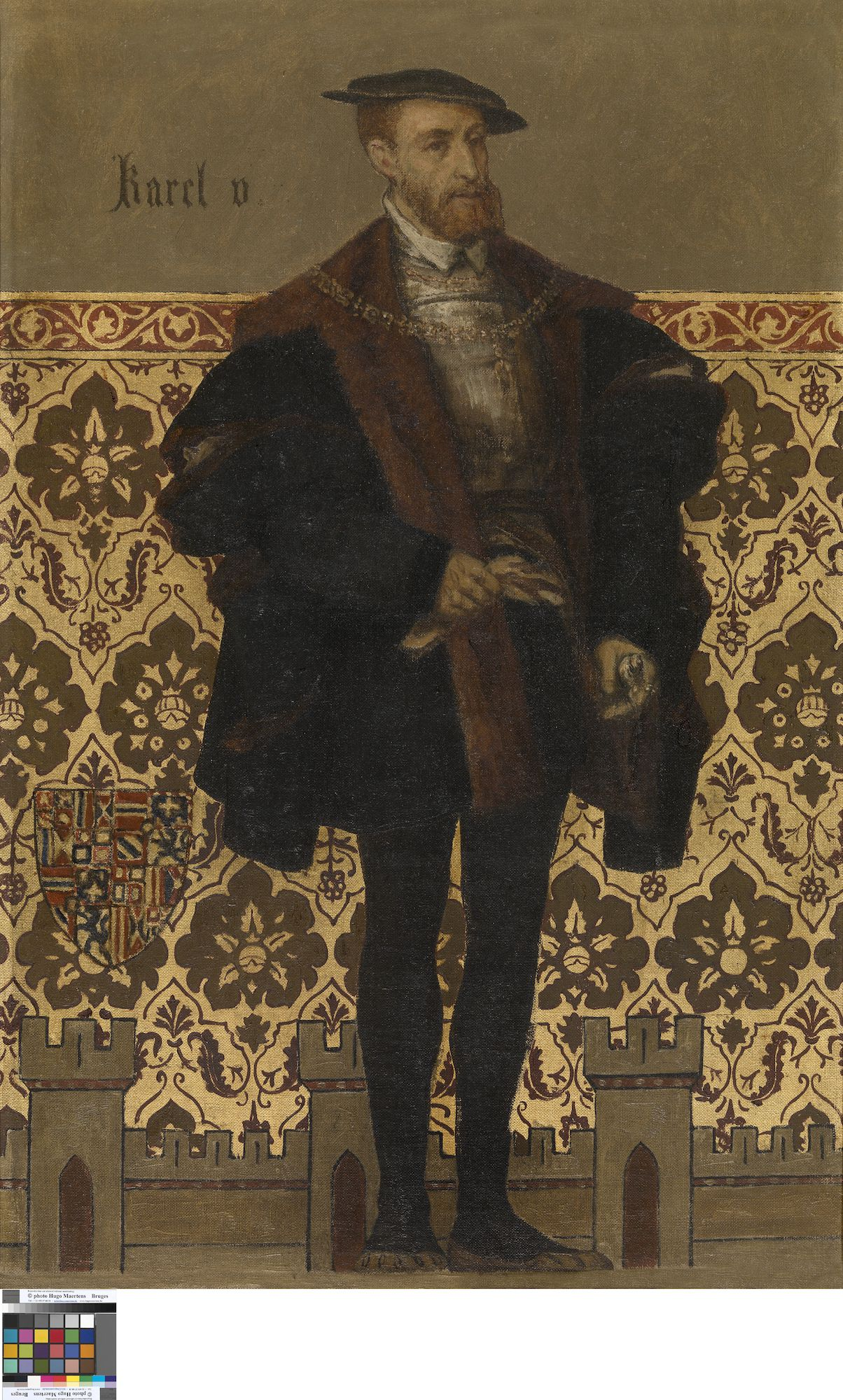
19th century portrait of Charles by Albrecht De Vriendt

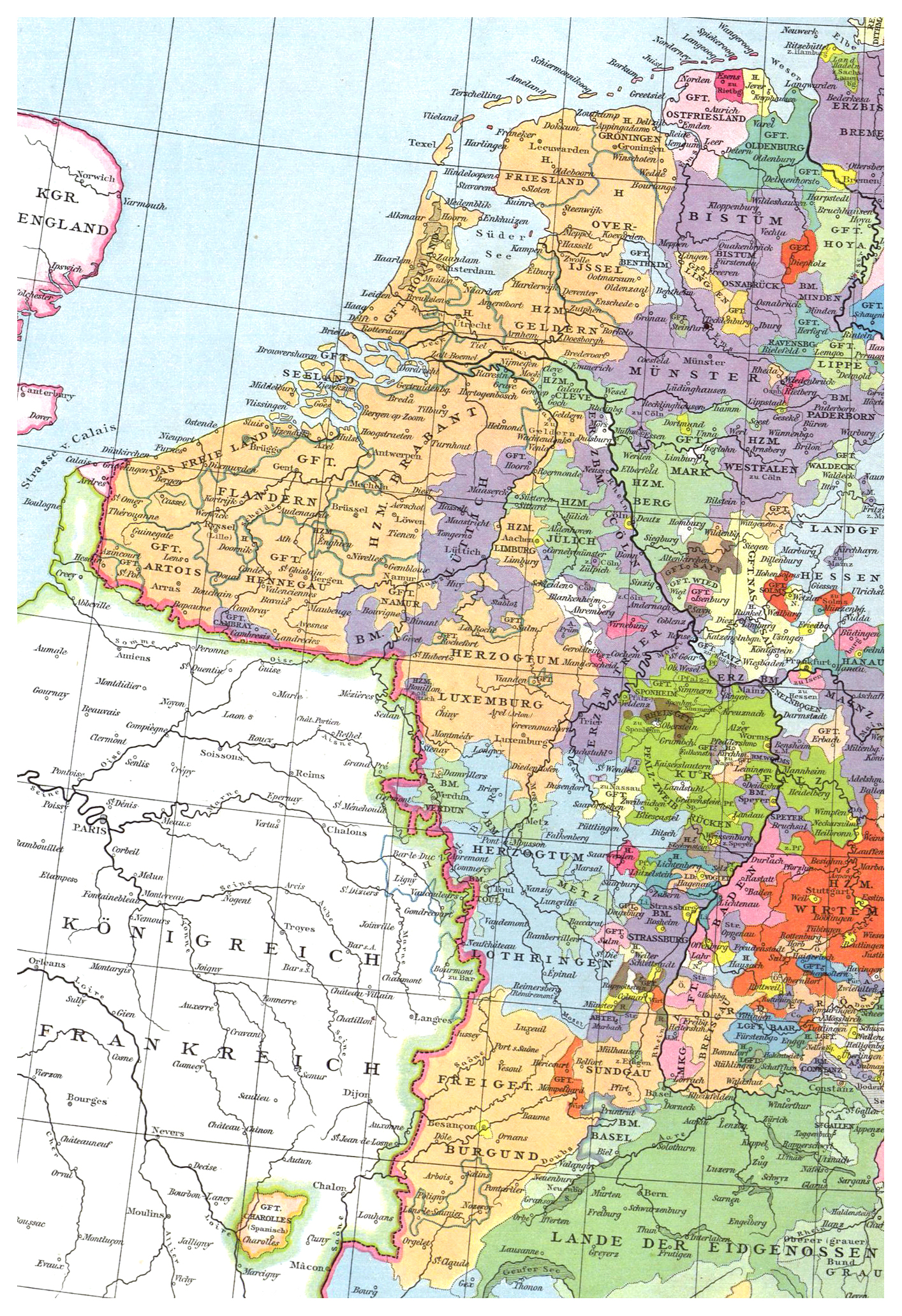
Charles' domains in the Habsburg Netherlands, and also in the Free County of Burgundy, and the County of Charolais, c. 1540 (all in light orange)

In 1506, Charles inherited all of his father's territories in the Low Countries, thus becoming the ruler of the Habsburg Netherlands. His inheritance also included the Free County of Burgundy (region of Franche-Comté) within the Holy Roman Empire, and the County of Charolais in the Kingdom of France. and, most notably, the Low Countries. His territories in the Low Countries mostly lay within the Holy Roman Empire, and partially within the French realm. Thus, Charles's birthplace, the city of Ghent, belonged to the County of Flanders, at that time still being the fief of the French crown. Since he was a minor, his aunt Margaret of Austria acted as regent, as appointed by Emperor Maximilian, until 1515. She soon found herself at war with France over Charles's requirement to pay homage to the French king for Flanders, Artois and Charolais, as his father had done. The outcome was that France relinquished its ancient claim on Flanders and Artois in 1528.

From 1515 to 1523, Charles's government in the Netherlands also had to contend with the rebellion of Frisian peasants (led by Pier Gerlofs Donia and Wijard Jelckama). The rebels were initially successful, but after a series of defeats, the remaining leaders were captured and executed in 1523.

Charles extended the Burgundian territory with the annexation of Tournai, Artois, Utrecht, Groningen, and Guelders. The Seventeen Provinces had been unified by Charles's Burgundian ancestors, but nominally were fiefs of either France or the Holy Roman Empire. Charles eventually won the Guelders Wars and united all provinces under his rule, the last one being the Duchy of Guelders. In 1549, Charles issued a Pragmatic Sanction, declaring the Habsburg Netherlands to be a unified entity of which his family would be the heirs.

The entire region of the Low Countries held an essential place in the Empire. For Charles V, they were his home, the region where he was born and spent his childhood. Because of trade and industry and the wealth of the region's cities, the Habsburg Netherlands also represented a significant income for Charles' treasury.

The Burgundian territories were generally loyal to Charles throughout his reign. The important city of Ghent rebelled in 1539 due to heavy tax payments demanded by Charles. The rebellion did not last long, however, as Charles's military response, with reinforcement from Fernando Álvarez de Toledo, 3rd Duke of Alba, was swift and humiliating to the rebels of Ghent.

=== Spanish kingdoms ===
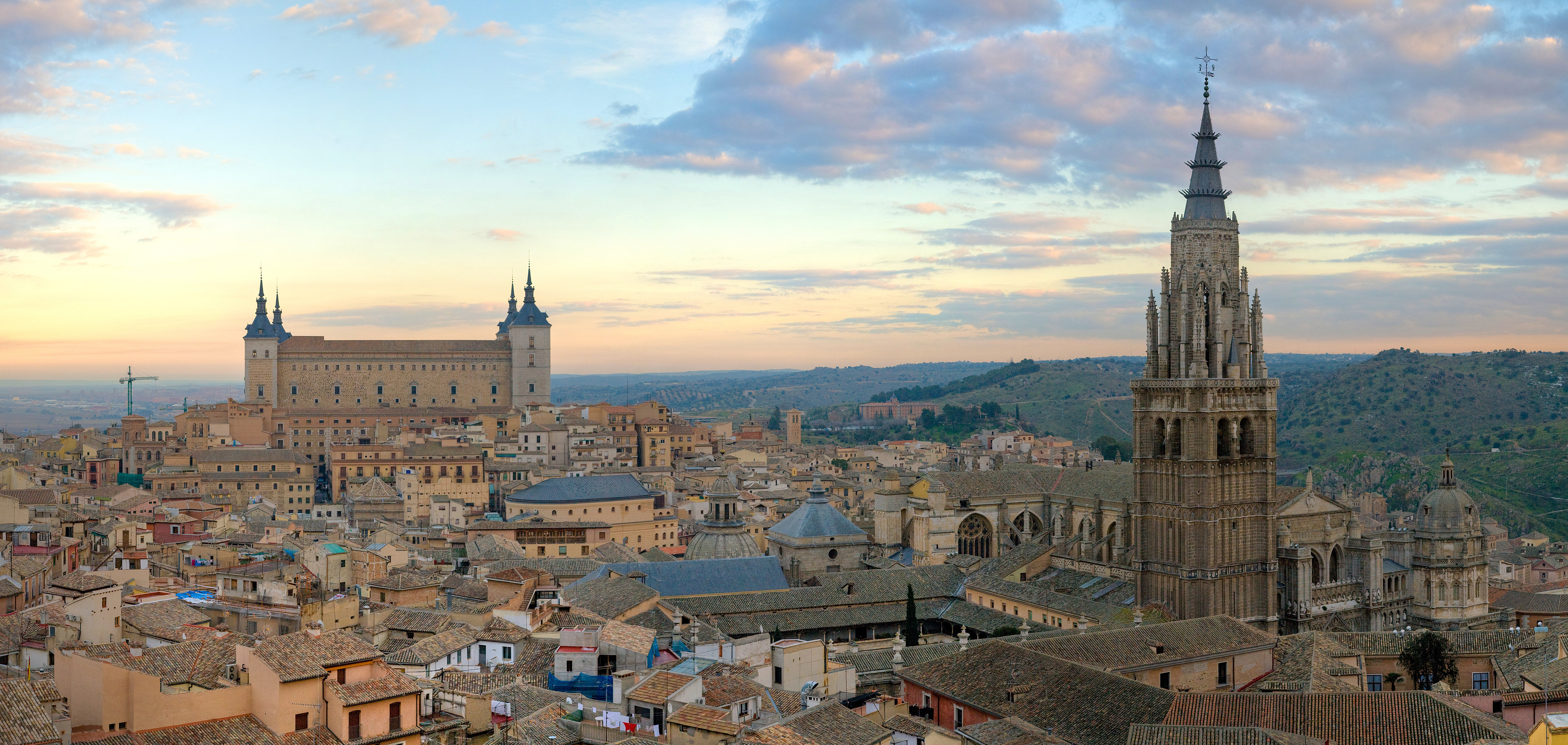
Toledo served as the main seat of the Imperial court of Charles V in Castile.

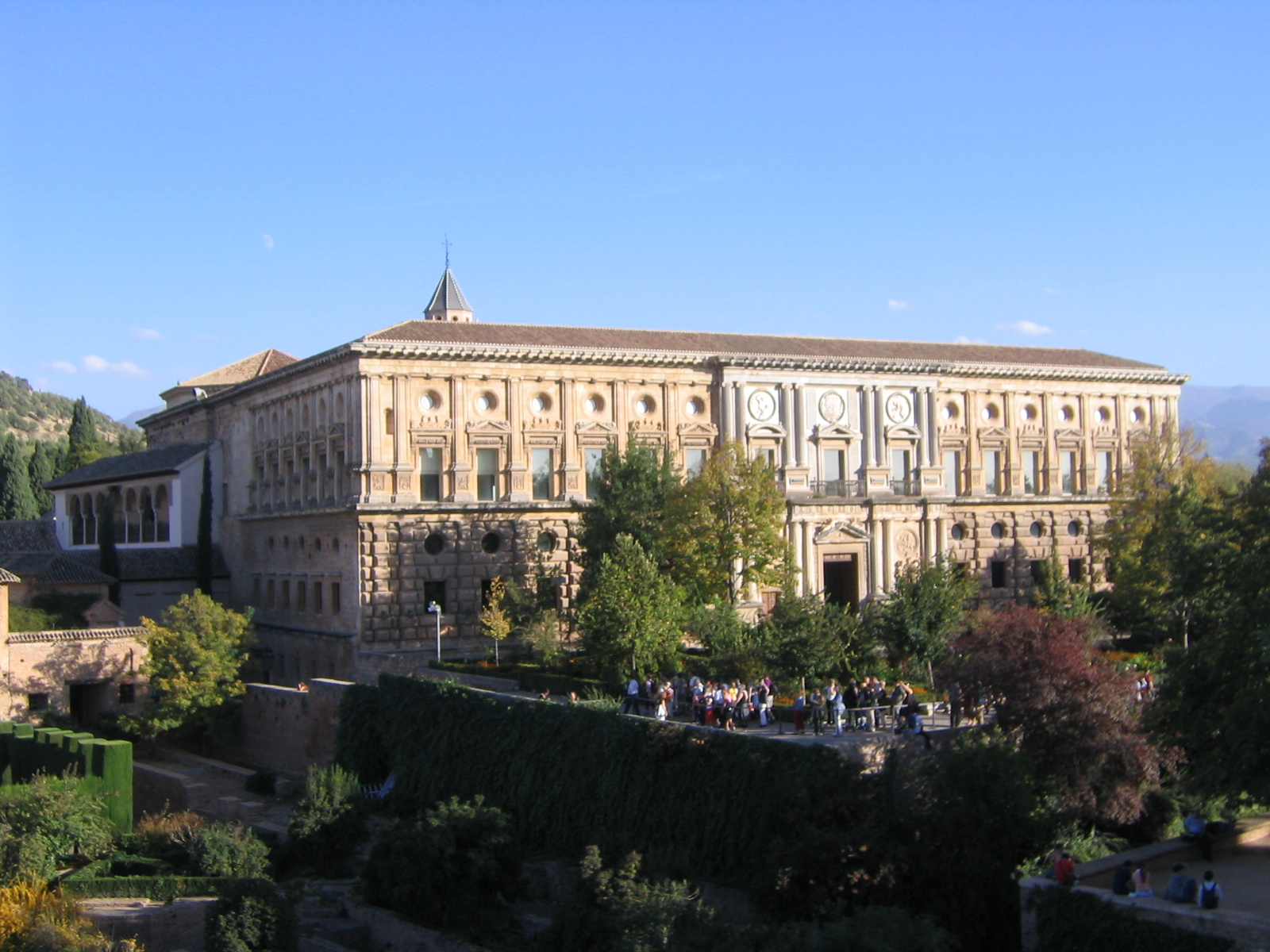
The exterior of the Palace of Charles V in Granada, which was built upon his wedding to Isabella of Portugal in 1526

In the Castilian Cortes of Valladolid in 1506 and of Madrid in 1510, Charles was sworn as the Prince of Asturias, heir-apparent to his mother Queen Joanna. On the other hand, in 1502, the Aragonese Corts gathered in Zaragoza and pledged an oath to Joanna as heiress-presumptive, but Alonso de Aragón, Archbishop of Zaragoza (an illegitimate son of King Ferdinand), expressed firmly that this oath could not establish jurisprudence, that is to say, modify the right of the succession, except by virtue of a formal agreement between the Corts and the King. So, upon the death of King Ferdinand II of Aragon, on 23 January 1516, Joanna inherited the Crown of Aragon, which consisted of Aragon, Mallorca, Catalonia, Valencia, Naples, Sicily and Sardinia, while Charles became governor general (regent). Nevertheless, the Flemish wished Charles to assume the royal title, and this was supported by Emperor Maximilian I and Pope Leo X. Consequently, after Ferdinand II's funeral on 14 March 1516, Charles I was proclaimed King of Castile and of Aragon jointly with his mother. Finally, the Castilian Regent, Cardinal Jiménez de Cisneros accepted the fait accompli, and the Castilian and Aragonese Cortes paid homage to him as King of Aragon jointly with his mother. Cisneros acceded to Charles's desire to be proclaimed king and imposed his instatement throughout the kingdom. Charles arrived in his new kingdoms in the autumn of 1517. Cisneros came to meet him but fell ill along the way, not without a suspicion of poison, and he died before reaching the King.

Due to the irregularity of Charles assuming the royal title while his mother, the legitimate queen, was alive, the negotiations with the Castilian Cortes in Valladolid (1518) proved difficult. In the end Charles was accepted under the following conditions: he would learn to speak Castilian; he would not appoint foreigners; he was prohibited from taking precious metals from Castile beyond the Quinto Real; and he would respect the rights of his mother, Queen Joanna. The Cortes paid homage to him in Valladolid in February 1518. After this, Charles departed to the Crown of Aragon. He managed to overcome the resistance of the Aragonese Cortes and Catalan Corts, and he was recognized as King of Aragon and Count of Barcelona jointly with his mother, while his mother was kept confined and ruled in name only. The Kingdom of Navarre had been invaded by Ferdinand of Aragon jointly with Castile in 1512, but he pledged a formal oath to respect the kingdom. On Charles's accession to the Spanish thrones, the Parliament of Navarre (Cortes) required him to attend the coronation ceremony (to become Charles IV of Navarre). Still, this demand fell on deaf ears, and the parliament kept piling up grievances.

Charles was accepted as sovereign, even though the Spanish felt uneasy with the Imperial style. Spanish kingdoms varied in their traditions. Castile had become an authoritarian, highly centralised kingdom, where the monarch's own will easily overrode legislative and justice institutions. By contrast, in the Crown of Aragon, and especially in the Pyrenean Kingdom of Navarre, law prevailed, and the monarchy was seen as a contract with the people. This became an inconvenience and a matter of dispute for Charles V and later kings since realm-specific traditions limited their absolute power. With Charles, the government became more absolute, even though, until his mother died in 1555, Charles did not hold absolute power in the country.

Soon, resistance to the Emperor arose because of heavy taxation to support foreign wars in which Castilians had little interest and because Charles tended to select Flemings for high offices in Castile and America, ignoring Castilian candidates. The resistance culminated in the Revolt of the Comuneros, which Charles suppressed. The Comuneros released Joanna and wanted to depose Charles and support Joanna to be the sole monarch instead. While Joanna refused to depose her son, her confinement continued after the revolt to discourage similar events in future. Immediately after crushing the Castilian revolt, Charles was confronted again with the pressing issue of Navarre when King Henry II attempted to reconquer the kingdom. Main military operations lasted until 1524, when Hondarribia surrendered to Charles's forces, but frequent cross-border clashes in the western Pyrenees only stopped in 1528 (Treaties of Madrid and Cambrai).

After these events, Navarre remained a matter of domestic and international litigation still for a century (a French dynastic claim to the throne did not end until the July Revolution in 1830). Charles wanted his son and heir Philip II to marry the heiress of Navarre, Jeanne d'Albret. Jeanne was instead forced to marry William, Duke of Julich-Cleves-Berg, but that childless marriage was annulled after four years. She next married Antoine de Bourbon, and both she and their son Henry of Navarre would oppose Philip II in the French Wars of Religion.

After its integration into Charles's empire, Castile guaranteed effective military units and its American possessions provided the bulk of the empire's financial resources. However, the two conflicting strategies of Charles V, enhancing the possessions of his family and protecting Catholicism against Protestant heretics, diverted resources away from building up the Spanish economy. Elite elements in Spain called for more protection for the commercial networks, which were threatened by the Ottoman Empire and Barbary pirates. Charles instead focused on defeating Protestantism in Germany and the Netherlands, which proved to be a lost cause. Each hastened the economic decline of the Spanish Empire in the next generation. The enormous budget deficit accumulated during Charles's reign, along with the inflation that affected the kingdom, resulted in declaring bankruptcy during the reign of Philip II.

=== Italian states ===
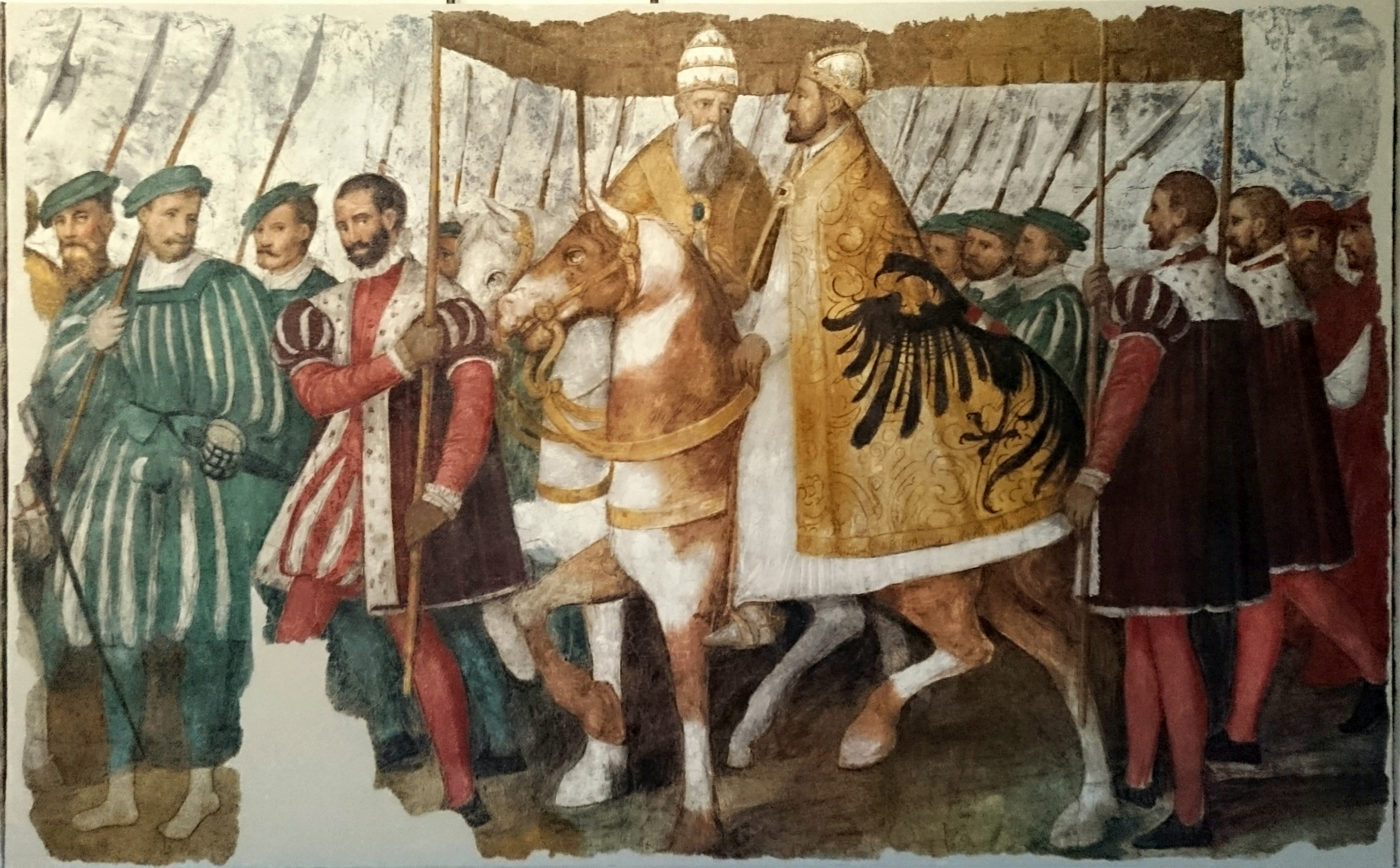
Pope Clement VII and Emperor Charles V on horseback under a canopy, a 1580 portrait by Jacopo Ligozzi. It depicts the entry of the Pope and the Emperor into Bologna in 1530 when Charles was crowned as Holy Roman Emperor by Clement VII.

The Crown of Aragon inherited by Charles included the Kingdom of Naples, the Kingdom of Sicily and the Kingdom of Sardinia. Additionally, as Holy Roman Emperor and King of Italy, Charles was the sovereign of several states of northern Italy. The Duchy of Milan, however, was under French control after its victory against Switzerland at the Battle of Marignano in 1515.

Imperial-Papal troops succeeded in re-installing Francesco II Sforza in Milan in 1521, in the context of an alliance between Charles V and Pope Leo X. A Franco-Swiss army was expelled from Lombardy at the Battle of Bicocca in 1522. In 1524, Francis I of France retook the initiative, crossing into Lombardy where Milan, along with several other cities, once again fell to his attack. Pavia alone held out, and on 24 February 1525 (Charles's twenty-fifth birthday), Charles's forces led by Charles de Lannoy captured Francis and crushed his army in the Battle of Pavia.

In 1535, Francesco II Sforza died without heirs, and Charles V annexed the territory as a vacant Imperial state with the help of Massimiliano Stampa, one of the most influential courtiers of the late Duke. Charles successfully held on to all of its Italian territories, though they were invaded again on multiple occasions during the Italian Wars.

In addition, Habsburg trade in the Mediterranean was consistently disrupted by the Ottoman Empire and its vassal Barbary pirates. In 1538, a Holy League consisting of all the Italian states and the Spanish kingdoms was formed to drive the Ottomans back, but it was defeated at the Battle of Preveza. Decisive naval victory eluded Charles; it would not be achieved until after his death, at the Battle of Lepanto in 1571.

=== Holy Roman Empire ===
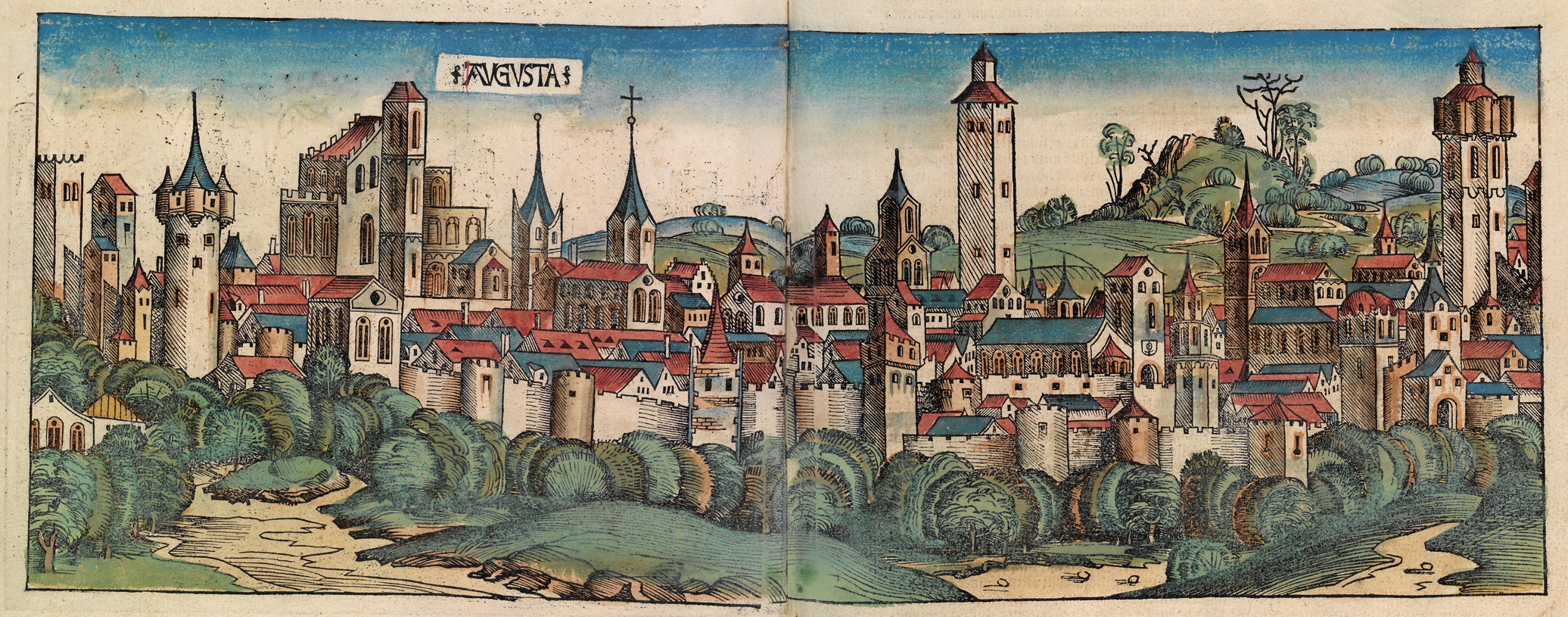
A panorama of Augsburg, the main German seat of the Imperial court and the location of many of the Imperial Diets presided over by Charles V depicted in a hand-coloured woodcut from the Nuremberg Chronicle

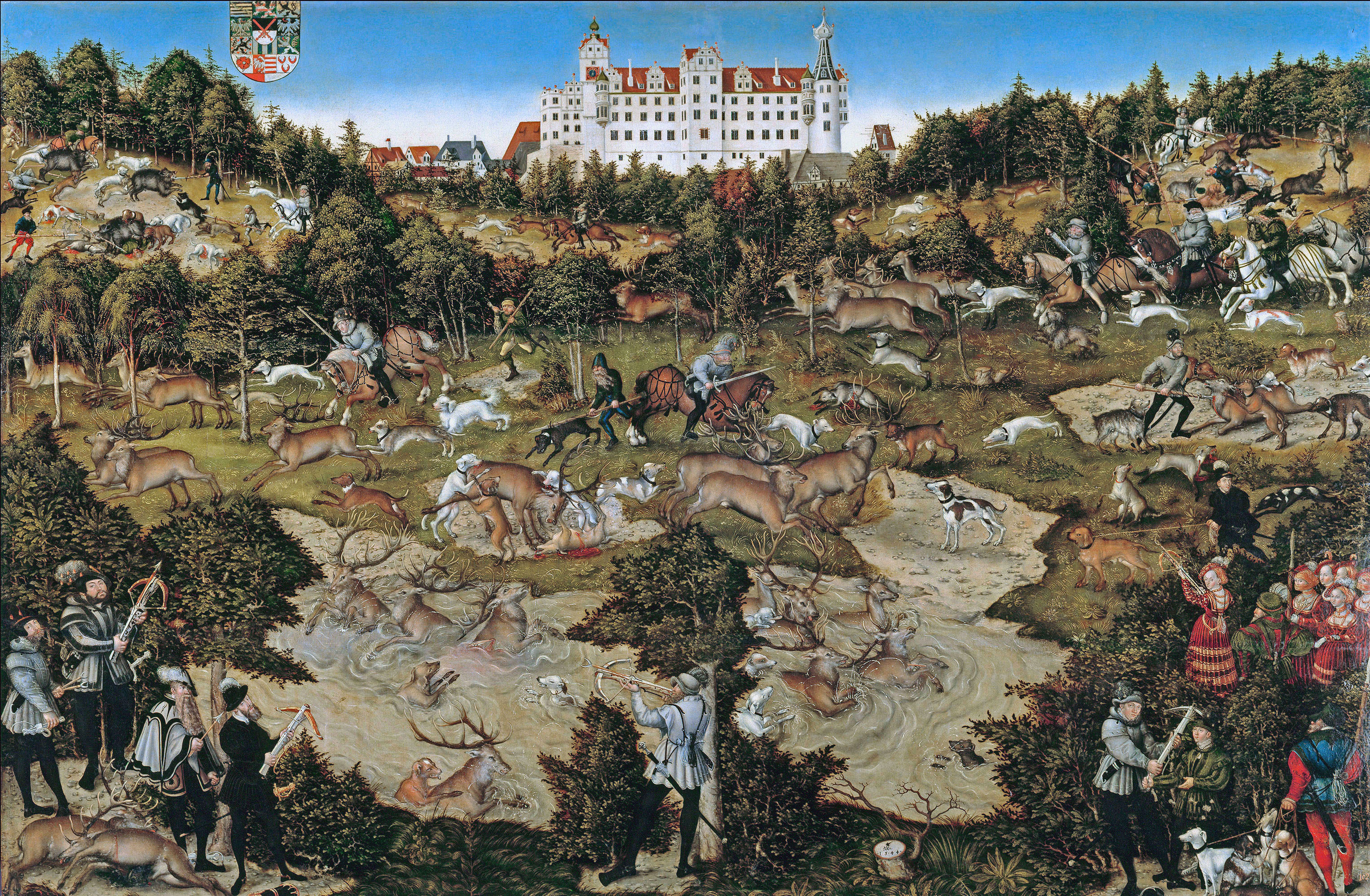
Hunting scene near Torgau with Charles V and John Frederick I, Elector of Saxony, by Lucas Cranach the Younger, 1544

After the death of his paternal grandfather, Maximilian, in 1519, Charles inherited the Habsburg monarchy. He was also the natural candidate of the electors to succeed his grandfather as Holy Roman Emperor. He defeated the candidacies of Frederick III of Saxony, Francis I of France, and Henry VIII of England in the 1519 Imperial election. According to some, Charles became emperor due to the fact that, by paying huge bribes to the electors, he was the highest bidder. He won the crown on 28 June 1519. On 23 October 1520, he was crowned in Germany and some ten years later, on 24 February 1530, he was crowned Holy Roman Emperor by Pope Clement VII in Bologna, the last emperor to receive a papal coronation. Others point out that while the electors were paid, this was not the reason for the outcome, or at most played only a small part. The important factor that swayed the final decision was that Frederick refused the offer, and made a speech in support of Charles on the ground that they needed a strong leader against the Ottomans, Charles had the resources and was a prince of German extraction.

Although even at the beginning of his reign, his position was more powerful than that of any of his predecessors, the decentralised structure of the Empire proved resilient, not least because of the Reformation. It was exactly during this crucial period that Charles V and Ferdinand were too busy with non-German affairs to prevent Imperial Cities in Upper Germany from becoming estranged from Imperial power.

Due to Charles V's difficulties in coordinating between the Austrian, Hungarian fronts and his Mediterranean fronts in the face of the Ottoman threat, as well as in his German, Burgundian and Italian theatres of war against German Protestant Princes and France, the defence of central Europe, as well as many responsibilities involving the management of the Empire, was subcontracted to Ferdinand. Charles entrusted Ferdinand with the Austrian lands in 1521-1522, and he had the German princes elect Ferdinand in 1531 as King of the Romans, who thus became his designated successor as emperor, a move that "had profound implications for state formation in south-eastern Europe". Afterwards, Ferdinand managed to gain control of Bohemia, Croatia, and Hungary, with support from local nobles and his German vassals.

He also refused to pass laws that went against the Muslims in Spain.

Charles abdicated as emperor in 1556 in favour of his brother Ferdinand; however, due to lengthy debate and bureaucratic procedure, the Imperial Diet did not accept the abdication (and thus make it legally valid) until 24 February 1558. Up to that date, Charles continued to use the title of emperor.

==== Wars with France ====
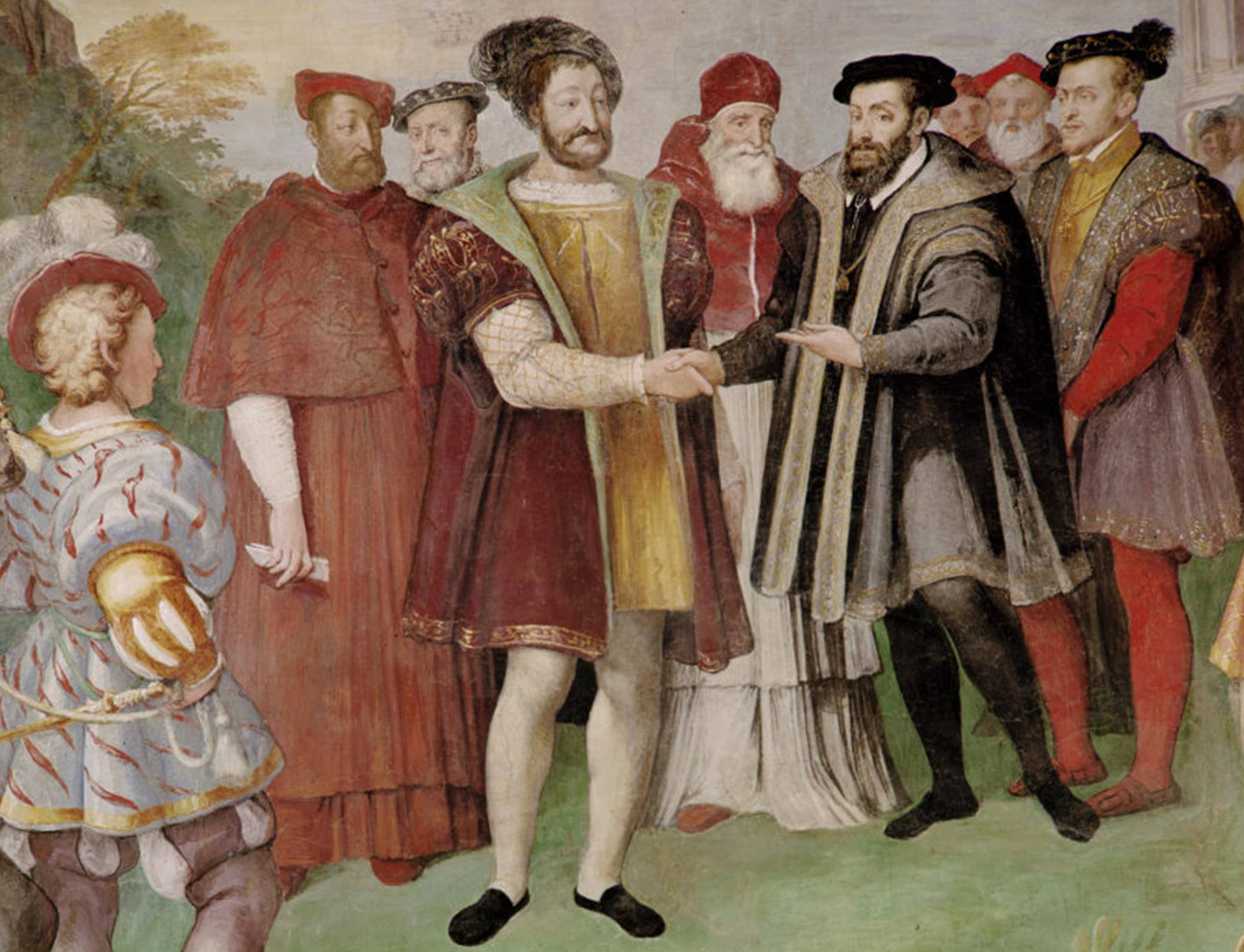
Francis I and Charles V made peace at the Truce of Nice in 1538. Francis refused to meet Charles in person, and the treaty was signed in separate rooms.

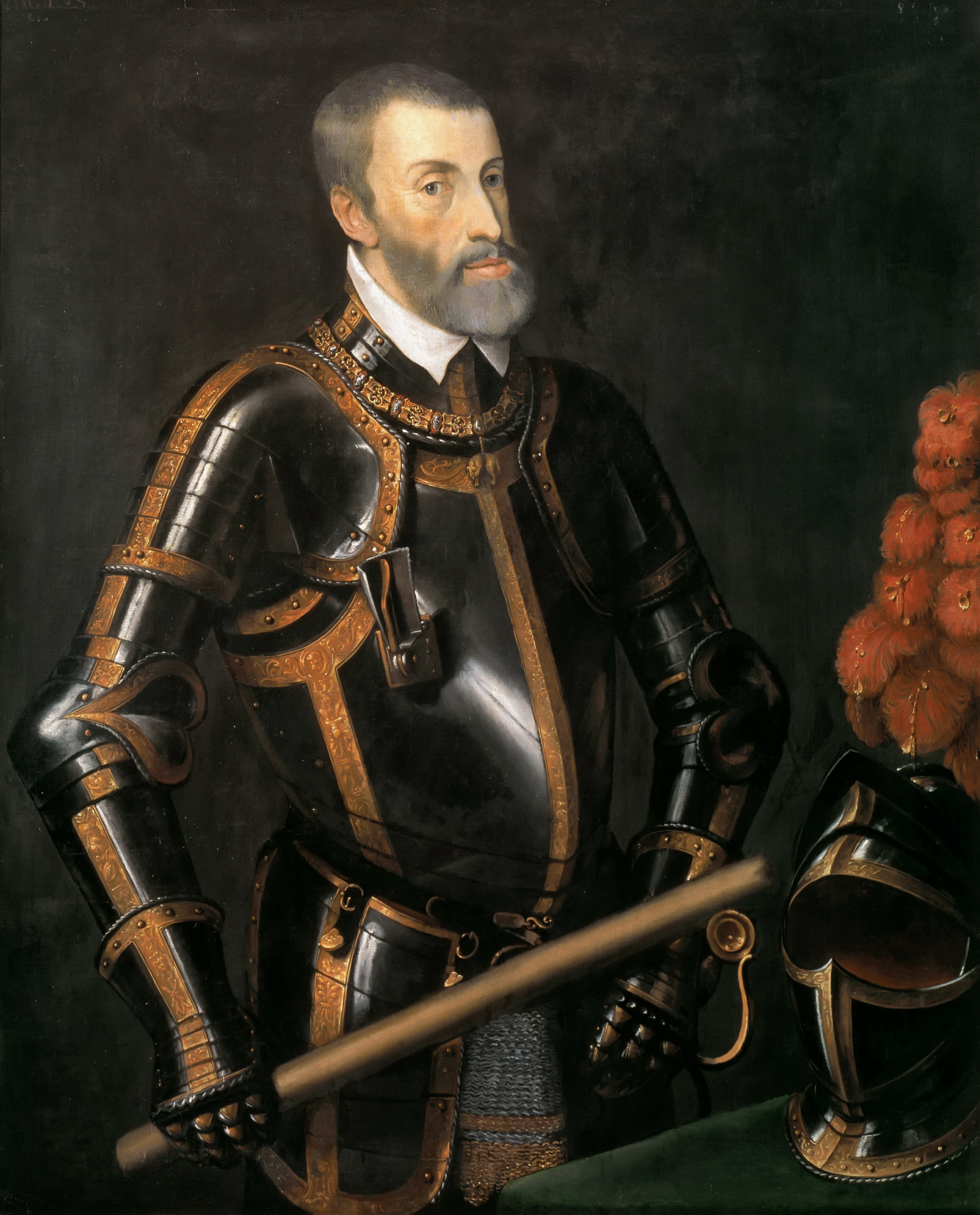
Charles V in the 1550s after Titian

Much of Charles's reign was taken up by conflicts with France, which found itself encircled by Charles's empire while it still maintained ambitions in Italy. In 1520, Charles visited England, where his aunt, Catherine of Aragon, urged her husband, Henry VIII (Charles's uncle by marriage), to ally himself with the Emperor. In 1508 Charles had been nominated by Henry VII to the Order of the Garter. His Garter stall plate survives in Saint George's Chapel.

The first war with Charles's great nemesis Francis I of France began in 1521. Charles allied with England and Pope Leo X against the French and the Venetians, and was highly successful, driving the French out of Milan and defeating and capturing Francis at the Battle of Pavia in 1525. To gain his freedom, Francis agreed to cede the Duchy of Burgundy to Charles in the Treaty of Madrid, as well as renouncing his support of Henry II's claim over Navarre.

When he was released, however, Francis had the Parlement of Paris denounce the treaty because it had been signed under duress, thus refusing to hand over the Duchy of Burgundy. France then joined the League of Cognac that Pope Clement VII had formed with Henry VIII of England, the Venetians, the Florentines, and the Milanese to resist imperial domination of Italy. In the ensuing war, Charles's sack of Rome (1527) and virtual imprisonment of Pope Clement VII in 1527 prevented the Pope from annulling the marriage of Henry VIII of England and Charles's aunt Catherine of Aragon, so Henry eventually broke with Rome, thus leading to the English Reformation. In other respects, the war was inconclusive. In the Treaty of Cambrai (1529), called the "Ladies' Peace" because it was negotiated between Charles's aunt and Francis' mother, Francis renounced his claims in Italy but retained control of Burgundy.

A third war erupted in 1536. Following the death of Francesco II Sforza, Charles installed his son Philip in the Duchy of Milan, despite Francis' claims on it. Already in the summer of 1536, the emperor personally led the invasion of Provence, and took Aix-en-Provence on 5 August 1536, affirming there his imperial rights over the ancient Kingdom of Arles, but those gains were soon lost. This war too was inconclusive. Francis failed to conquer Milan, but he succeeded in conquering most of the lands of Charles's ally, Charles III, Duke of Savoy, including Turin. The Truce of Nice was concluded in 1538, on the basis of uti possidetis. It ended the war, but lasted only a short time.

War resumed in 1542, with Francis now allied with Ottoman Sultan Suleiman the Magnificent and Charles once again allied with Henry VIII. Despite the sack of Nice by a Franco-Ottoman fleet, the French could not advance toward Milan, while a joint Anglo-Imperial invasion of northern France, led by Charles himself, won some successes but was ultimately abandoned, leading to another peace and restoration of the status quo ante bellum in 1544.

A final war erupted with Francis' son and successor, Henry II of France, in 1551. Henry won early success in Lorraine, where he captured Metz, but French offensives in Italy failed. The Duchy of Florence greatly assisted Imperial effort in exchange for support against the Republic of Siena, which was conquered. Charles abdicated midway through this conflict, leaving further conduct of the war to his son, Philip II of Spain, and his brother, Ferdinand I, Holy Roman Emperor.

==== Conflicts with the Ottoman Empire ====
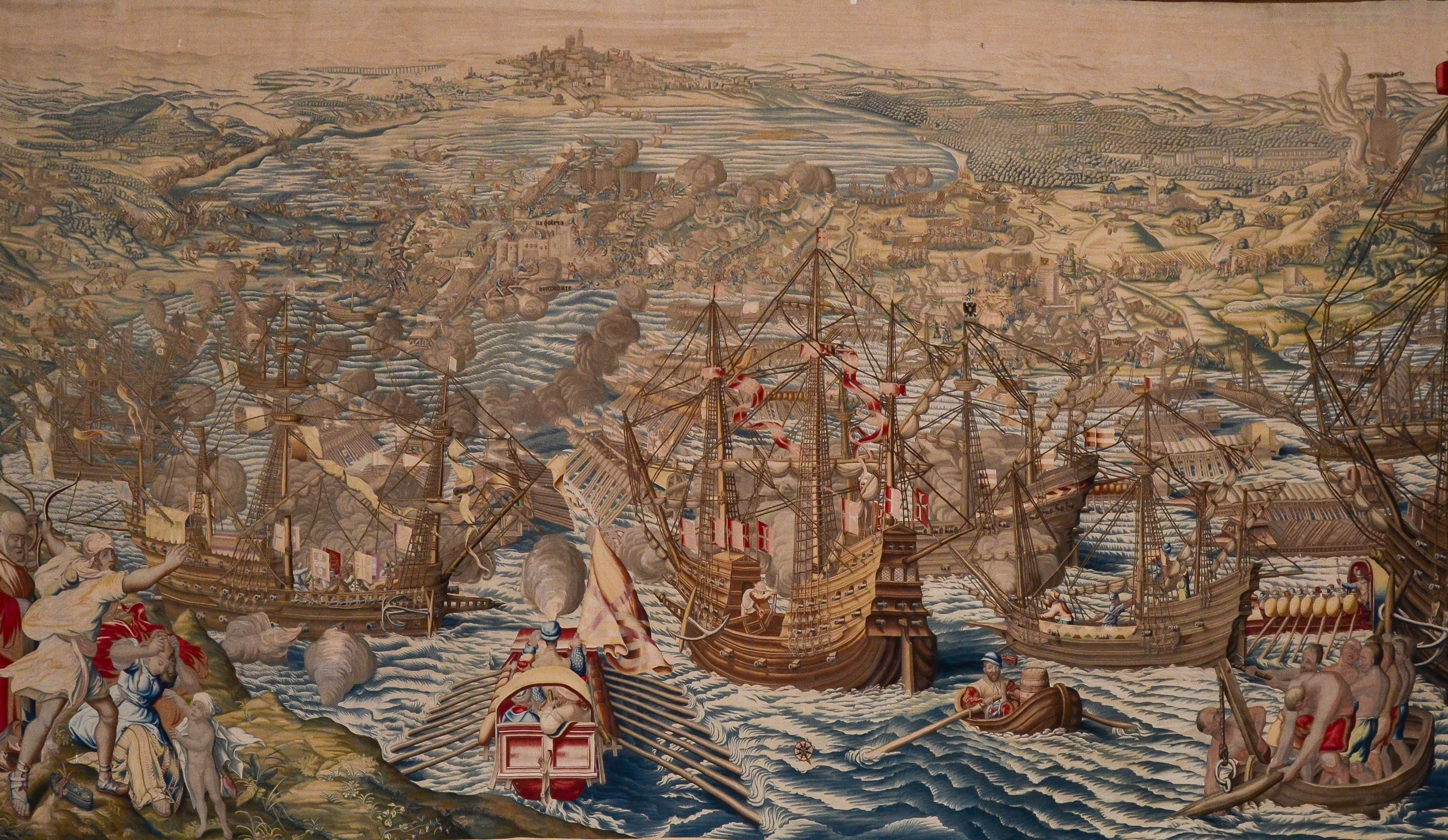
Detail of a tapestry depicting the conquest of Tunis in the Tapestry Room of the Alcázar Palace in Seville

Charles fought continually with the Ottoman Empire and its sultan, Suleiman the Magnificent. The defeat of Hungary at the Battle of Mohács in 1526 "sent a wave of terror over Europe." The Muslim advance in Central Europe was halted at the Siege of Vienna (1529), followed by a counter-attack of Charles V across the Danube river. However, by 1541, central and southern Hungary fell under Ottoman control.

Charles launched a first attack under admiral Andrea Doria in 1532, capturing Coron and defending it afterwards before abandoning it, having found no Christian state willing to support its defense. After Tunis was conquered by Ottoman admiral Hayreddin Barbarossa, the most eminent of the Barbary corsairs, Charles participated personally in a large-scale expedition to oust him, with the participation of Doria, Bazán the Elder, García de Toledo and other Imperial admirals. Barbarossa managed to escape, even if Habsburg control of Tunis was reestablished. Barbary corsairs remained a threat, regularly assailing Christian coasts to make captives for the Barbary slave trade. The advance of the Ottomans in the Mediterranean and central Europe chipped at the foundations of Habsburg power and diminished Imperial prestige.

In 1536, Francis I allied France with Suleiman against Charles. While Francis was persuaded to sign a peace treaty in 1538, he again allied himself with the Ottomans in 1542 in a Franco-Ottoman alliance. In 1543, Charles allied himself with Henry VIII and forced Francis to sign the Truce of Crépy-en-Laonnois. Meanwhile, Charles V made overtures to the Safavid Empire to open a second front against the Ottomans, in an attempt at creating a Habsburg–Persian alliance. Contacts were positive, but rendered difficult by enormous distances. In effect, however, the Safavids did enter into conflict with the Ottoman Empire in the Ottoman–Safavid War, forcing it to split its military resources.

In 1538, Charles participated in a Holy League to launch a joint expedition against Ottoman waters along with the republic of Venice and other Christian players. However, the subsequent Battle of Preveza against Barbarossa was lost due to infighting, with conflicting reports over its course. It was followed by the siege of Castelnuovo, during which the only Ottoman fortress captured by the League was retaken by the Ottomans, although in a severely costly siege. Minor victories of his navy in Girolata and Alboran preceded a new expedition to Algiers headed personally by Charles, but the ill-planned venture was wrecked by hostile weather. Losses amongst the invading force were heavy, with 150 ships lost, plus large numbers of sailors and soldiers. A Turkish chronicler stated that the Berber tribes massacred 12,000 invaders.

In 1547, Charles signed a humiliating treaty with the Ottomans to gain himself some respite from the huge expenses of their war. Charles came in action again against Ottoman domain in 1550, with expedition to Mahdia, repulsing an Ottoman attempt to lift the siege. Mahdia was conquered, but upon difficulties to defend it, he later ordered it to be demolished and abandoned.

==== Protestant Reformation ====
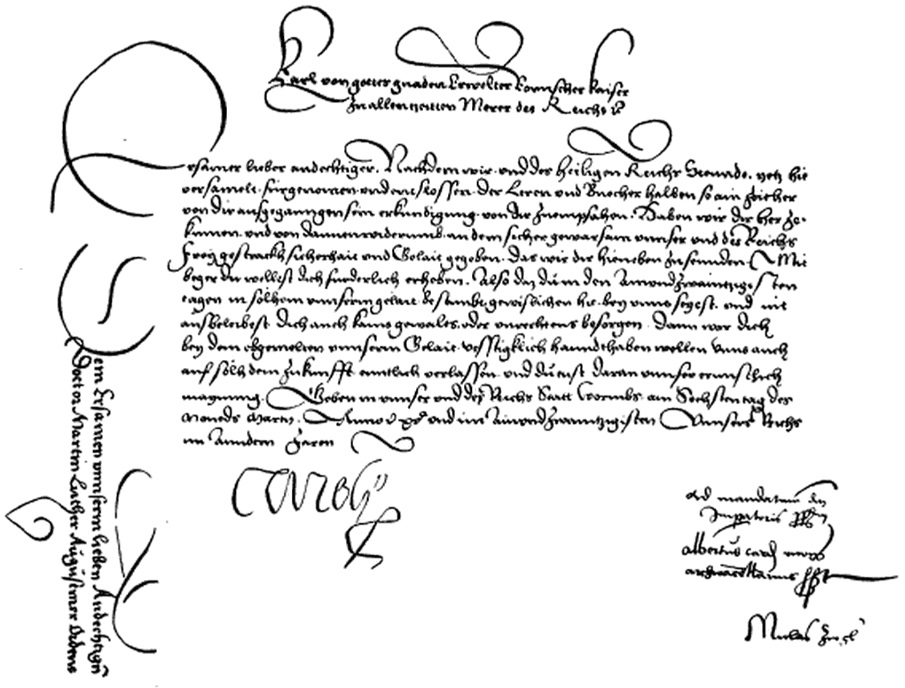
Summons for Martin Luther to appear at the Diet of Worms signed by Charles V; the text on the left was on the reverse side.

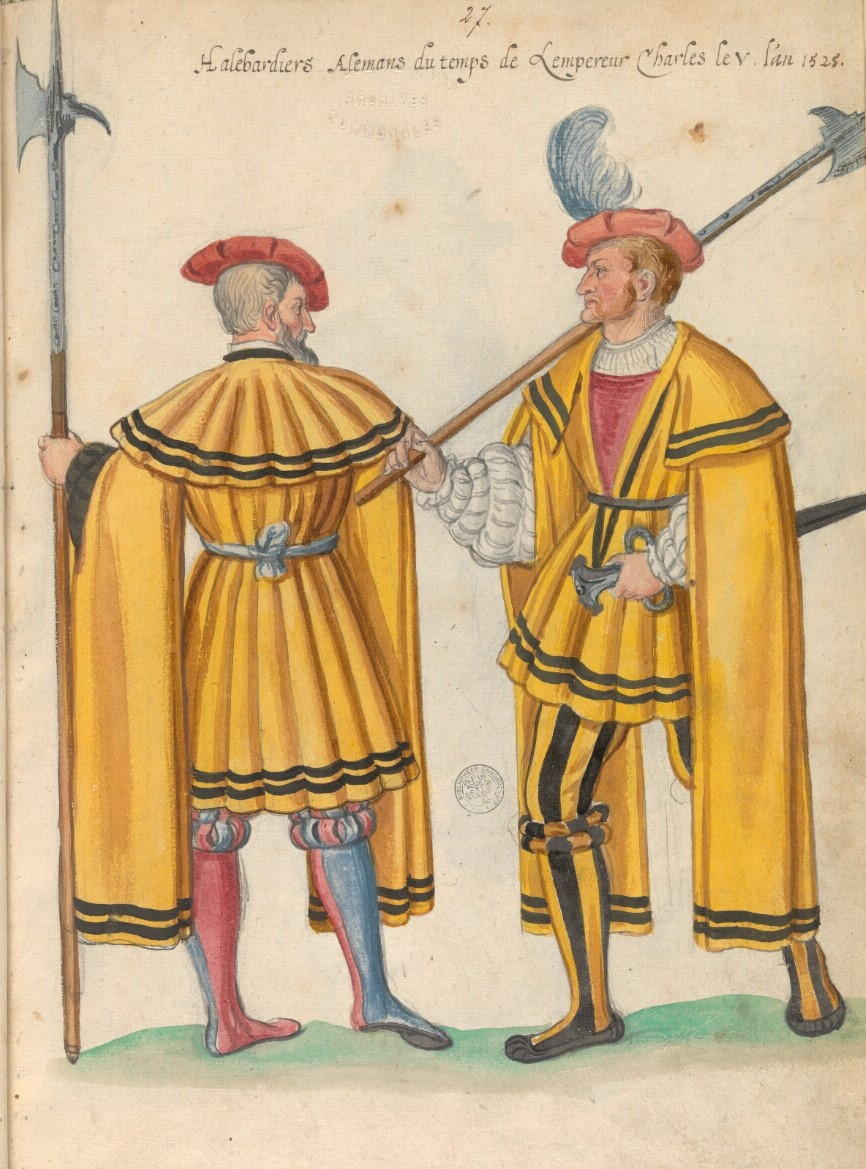
16th century perception of German soldiers during Charles's reign (1525) portrayed in the manuscript "Théâtre de tous les peuples et nations de la terre avec leurs habits et ornemens divers, tant anciens que modernes, diligemment depeints au naturel". Painted by Lucas de Heere in the second half of the 16th century. Preserved in the Ghent University Library.

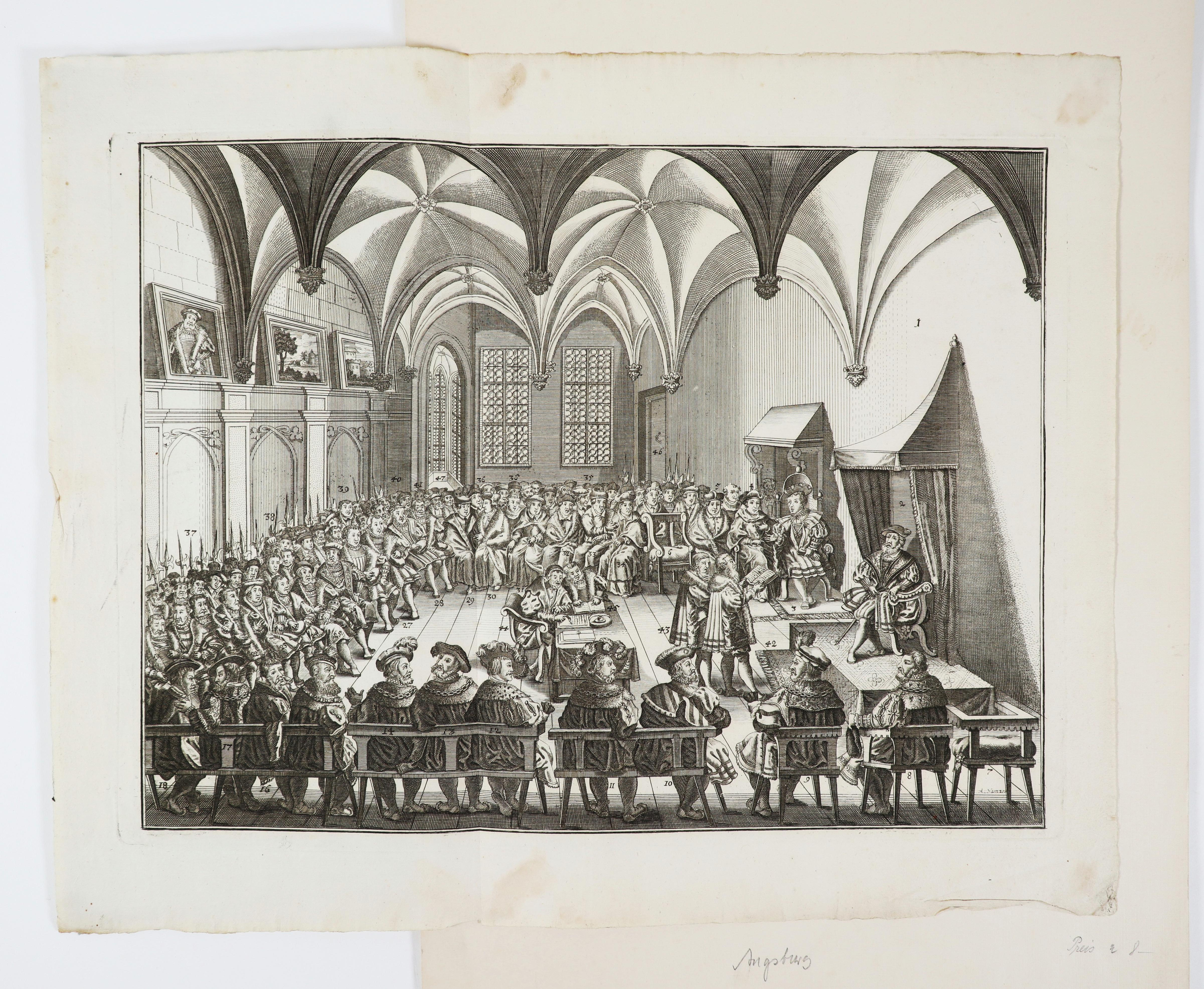
Charles V receives the Augsburg Confession at the Diet of Augsburg on 25 June 1530

The issue of the Reformation was first brought to the imperial attention under Charles V. As Holy Roman Emperor, Charles called Martin Luther to the Diet of Worms in 1521, promising him safe conduct if he would appear. After Luther defended the Ninety-five Theses and his writings, the Emperor commented, "That monk will never make me a heretic". Charles V relied on religious unity to govern his various realms, otherwise unified only in his person, and perceived Luther's teachings as a disruptive form of heresy. He outlawed Luther and issued the Edict of Worms, declaring:

You know that I am a descendant of the Most Christian Emperors of the great German people, of the Catholic Kings of Spain, of the Archdukes of Austria, and of the Dukes of Burgundy. All of these, their whole life long, were faithful sons of the Roman Church [...] After their deaths, they left, by natural law and heritage, these holy catholic rites, for us to live and die by, following their example. And so until now I have lived as a true follower of these our ancestors. I am therefore resolved to maintain everything which my forebears have established to the present.

Charles V, however, kept his word and left Martin Luther free to leave the city. Frederick III, Elector of Saxony and protector of Luther, lamented the outcome of the Diet. On the road back from Worms, Luther was kidnapped by Frederick's men and hidden in a distant castle in Wartburg. There, he began to work on his German translation of the Bible. The spread of Lutheranism led to two major revolts: that of the knights in 1522–1523 and that of the peasants led by Thomas Muntzer in 1524–1525. While the pro-Imperial Swabian League, in conjunction with Protestant princes afraid of social revolts, restored order, Charles V used the instrument of pardon to maintain peace. Conflict with the pope led Charles' agents to remind the pope of the bad position that the Protestants were putting the Vatican in.

Following this, Charles V took a tolerant approach and pursued a policy of reconciliation with the Lutherans. The 1530 Imperial Diet of Augsburg was requested by Emperor Charles V to decide on three issues: first, the defence of the Empire against the Ottoman threat; second, issues related to policy, currency and public well-being; and, third, disagreements about Christianity, in attempt to reach some compromise and a chance to deal with the German situation. The Diet was inaugurated by the emperor on 20 June. It produced numerous outcomes, most notably the 1530 declaration of the Lutheran estates known as the Augsburg Confession (Confessio Augustana), a central document of Lutheranism. Luther's assistant Philip Melanchthon went even further and presented it to Charles V. The Emperor strongly rejected it, and in 1531 the Schmalkaldic League was formed by Protestant princes. In 1532, Charles V recognised the League and effectively suspended the Edict of Worms with the standstill of Nuremberg. The standstill required the Protestants to continue to take part in the Imperial wars against the Turks and the French, and postponed religious affairs until an ecumenical council of the Catholic Church was called by the Pope to solve the issue.

Due to Papal delays in organising a general council, Charles V decided to organise a German summit and presided over the Colloquy of Regensburg between Catholics and Lutherans in 1541, but no compromise was achieved. In 1545, the Council of Trent was finally opened and the Counter-Reformation began. The Catholic initiative was supported by a number of the princes of the Holy Roman Empire. However, the Schmalkaldic League refused to recognise the validity of the council and the occupied territories of Catholic princes. Therefore, Charles V outlawed the Schmalkaldic League and opened hostilities against it in 1546. The next year, his forces drove the League's troops out of southern Germany and defeated John Frederick, Elector of Saxony, and Philip of Hesse at the Battle of Mühlberg, capturing both. At the Augsburg Interim in 1548, he created a solution giving certain allowances to Protestants until the Council of Trent would restore unity. However, members of both sides resented the Interim and some actively opposed it.

The council was re-opened in 1550 with the participation of Lutherans, and Charles V set up the Imperial court in Innsbruck, Austria, sufficiently close to Trent for him to follow the evolution of the debates. In 1552, Protestant princes, in alliance with Henry II of France, rebelled again and the Second Schmalkaldic War began. Maurice of Saxony, instrumental for the Imperial victory in the first conflict, switched sides to the Protestant cause and bypassed the Imperial army by marching directly into Innsbruck with the goal of capturing the Emperor. Charles V was forced to flee the city during an attack of gout and barely made it alive to Villach in a state of semi-consciousness, carried in a litter. After failing to recapture Metz from the French, Charles V returned to the Low Countries for the last years of his emperorship. In 1555, he instructed his brother Ferdinand to sign the Peace of Augsburg in his name. The agreements led to the religious division of Germany between Catholic and Protestant princedoms.

== Abdications and death ==
=== Division of the Habsburgs ===
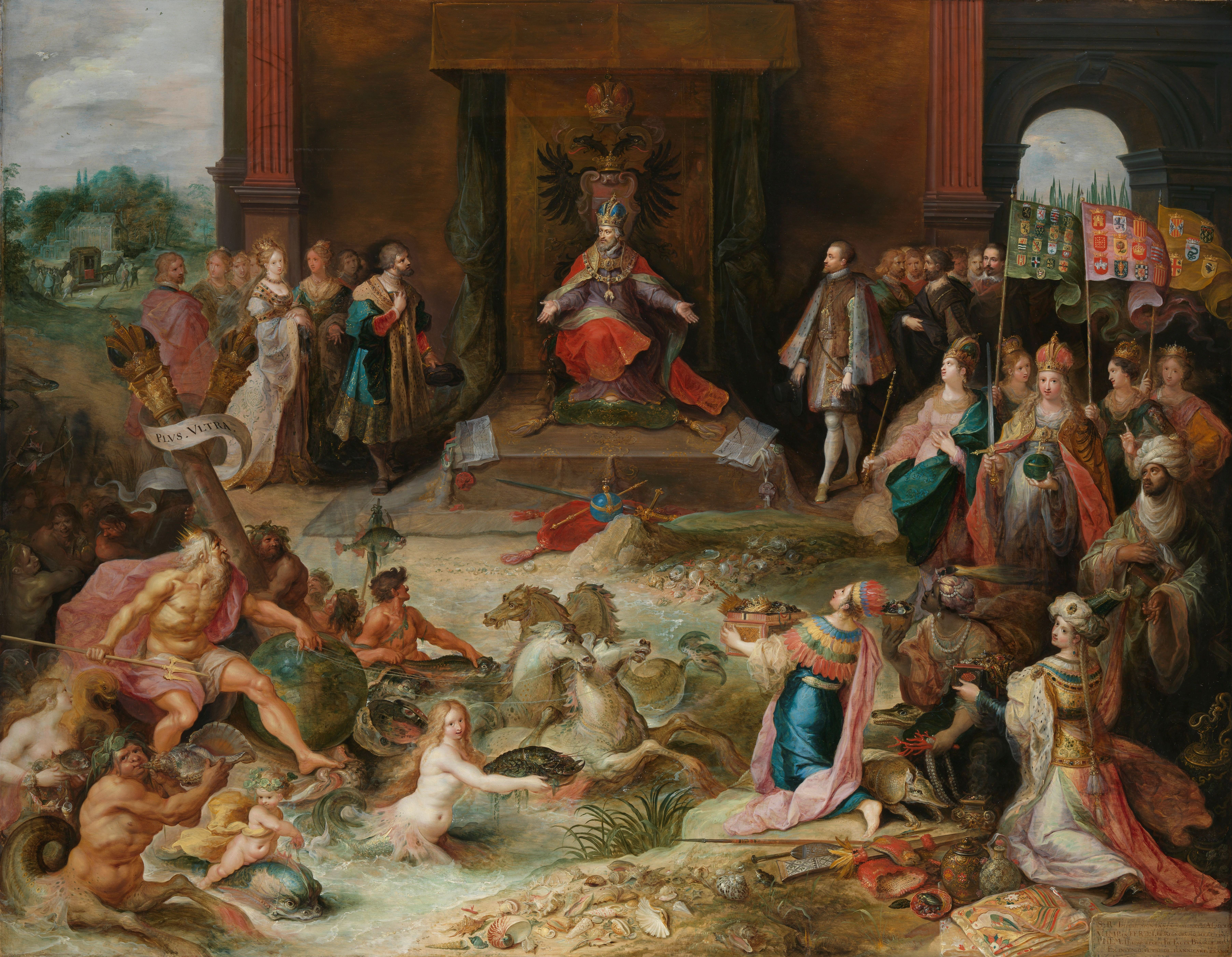
In Allegory on the abdication of Emperor Charles V in Brussels, Frans Francken the Younger's depiction of Charles V in the allegorical act of dividing the entire world between Philip II of Spain and Emperor Ferdinand I

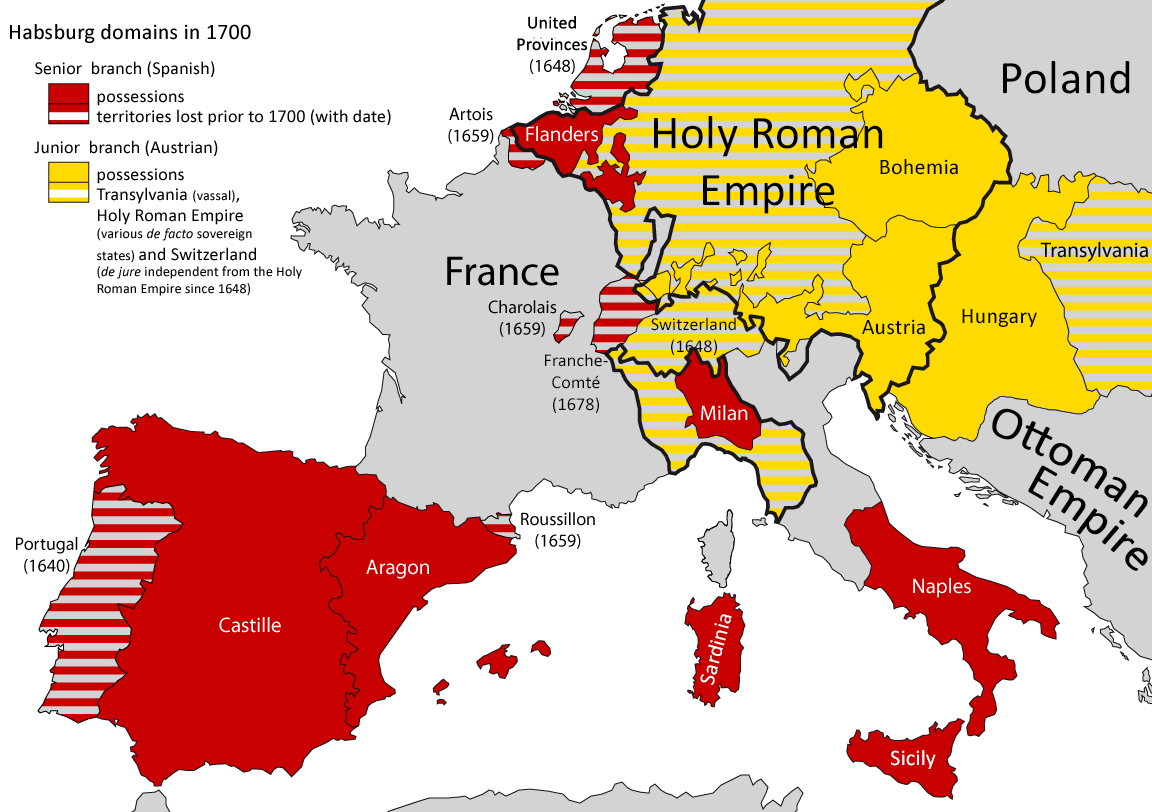
Habsburg dominions in the centuries following their partition by Charles V

Between 1554 and 1556, Charles V gradually divided the Habsburg empire between a senior Spanish line and an Austrian branch of the House of Habsburg. His abdications all occurred at the Palace of Coudenberg in Brussels. First, he abdicated the thrones of Sicily and Naples, the latter a Papal fief, and the Imperial Duchy of Milan, in favour of his son Philip II of Spain on 25 July 1554. Philip was secretly invested with Milan already in 1540 and again in 1546, but only in 1554 did the Emperor make it public. Upon the abdications of Naples and Sicily, Philip was invested by Pope Julius III with the Kingdom of Naples on 2 October and with the Kingdom of Sicily on 18 November.

The most famous – and only public – abdication took place a year later, on 25 October 1555, when Charles announced to the States General of the Netherlands (reunited in the great hall where he was emancipated forty years before by Emperor Maximilian) his abdication of those territories in favour of his son Philip as well as his intention to step down from all of his positions and retire to a monastery. During the ceremony, the gout-afflicted Emperor Charles V leaned on the shoulder of his advisor William the Silent and, crying, pronounced his resignation speech:

When I was nineteen [...] I undertook to be a candidate for the Imperial crown, not to increase my possessions but rather to engage myself more vigorously in working for the welfare of Germany and my other realms [...] and in the hopes of thereby bringing peace among the Christian peoples and uniting their fighting forces for the defence of the Catholic faith against the Ottomans. [...] I had almost reached my goal when the attack by the French king and some German princes called me once more to arms. Against my enemies, I accomplished what I could, but success in war lies in the hands of God, who gives victory or takes it away, as He pleases. [...] I must, for my part, confess that I have often misled myself, either from youthful inexperience, from the pride of mature years, or from some other weakness of human nature. I nonetheless declare to you that I never knowingly or willingly acted unjustly. [...] If actions of this kind are nevertheless justly laid to my account, I formally assure you now that I did them unknowingly and against my own intention. I therefore beg those present today, whom I have offended in this respect, together with those who are absent, to forgive me.

He concluded the speech by mentioning his voyages: ten to the Low Countries, nine to Germany, seven to Spain, seven to Italy, four to France, two to England, and two to North Africa. His last public words were, "My life has been one long journey."

With no fanfare, in 1556, he finalised his abdications. On 16 January 1556, he gave Spain and the Spanish Empire in the Americas to Philip. On 27 August 1556, he abdicated as Holy Roman Emperor in favour of his brother Ferdinand, elected King of the Romans in 1531. The succession was recognised by the prince-electors assembled at Frankfurt only in 1558, and by the Pope only in 1559. The Imperial abdication also marked the beginning of Ferdinand's legal and suo jure rule in the Austrian possessions, that he governed in Charles's name since 1521–1522, and were territorially linked with his rule over Hungary and Bohemia since 1526.

According to scholars, Charles decided to abdicate for a variety of reasons: the religious division of Germany sanctioned in 1555; the state of Spanish finances, bankrupted with inflation by the time his reign ended; the revival of Italian Wars with attacks from Henry II of France; the never-ending advance of the Ottomans in the Mediterranean and central Europe; and his declining health, in particular attacks of gout such as the one that forced him to postpone an attempt to recapture the city of Metz where he was later defeated.

=== Retirement, death and burial ===
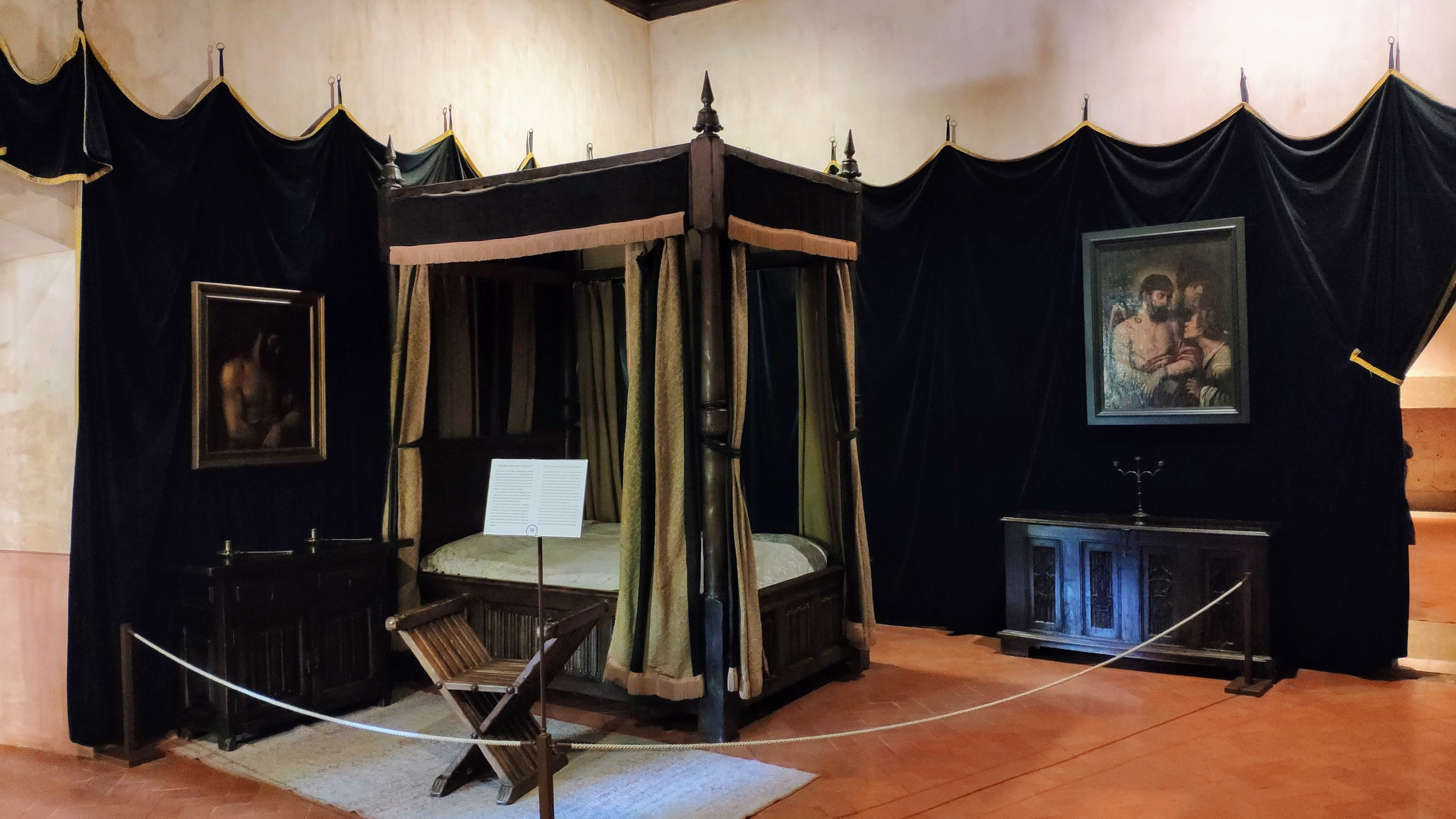
The deathbed of the Emperor at the Monastery of Yuste, Cáceres

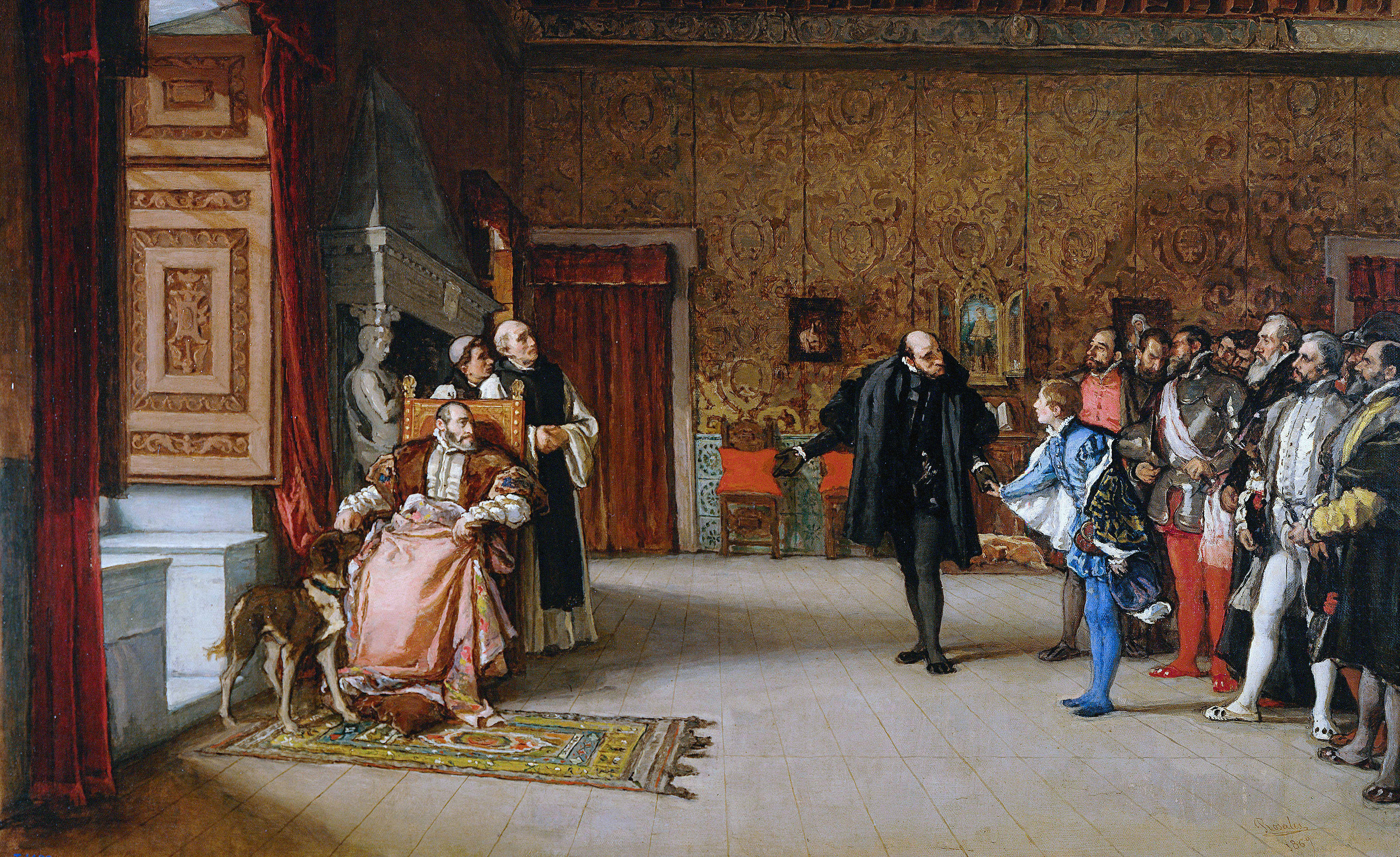
Charles's illegitimate son John of Austria being presented to Charles in Yuste, by Eduardo Rosales

In September 1556, Charles left the Low Countries and sailed to Spain, accompanied by his sisters, Mary of Hungary and Eleanor of Austria. He arrived at the Monastery of Yuste of Extremadura in 1557. He continued to correspond widely and kept an interest in the situation of the empire, while suffering from severe gout. He lived alone in a secluded monastery, surrounded by paintings by Titian and with clocks lining every wall, which some historians believe were symbols of his reign and his lack of time. In August 1558, Charles was taken seriously ill, with what was diagnosed in the twenty-first century as malaria.

He died in the early hours of the morning on 21 September 1558, at the age of 58, holding in his hand the cross that his wife Isabella had been holding when she died. Following his death, there were a plethora of commemorations in his empire, including in Mexico and Peru. Some 30,000 masses were arranged for the soul of the Emperor. Some 30,000 gold ducats that he had set aside for the ransom of prisoners, poor virgins, and paupers were distributed. He still owed huge debts from his constant warfare far beyond the funds on hand, which his heirs spent decades paying off.

Charles was originally buried in the chapel of the Monastery of Yuste, but he left a codicil in his last will and testament asking for the establishment of a new religious foundation in which he would be reburied with Isabella. Following his return to Spain in 1559, their son Philip undertook the task of fulfilling his father's wish when he founded the Monastery of San Lorenzo de El Escorial. After the Monastery's Royal Crypt was completed in 1574, the bodies of Charles and Isabella were relocated and re-interred into a small vault directly underneath the altar of the Royal Chapel, in accordance with Charles's wishes to be buried "half-body under the altar and half-body under the priest's feet" side by side with Isabella.

They remained in the Royal Chapel while the famous Basilica of the Monastery and the Royal tombs were still under construction. In 1654, after the Basilica and Royal tombs were finally completed during the reign of their great-grandson Philip IV of Spain, the remains of Charles and Isabella were moved into the Royal Pantheon of Kings, which lies directly under the Basilica. On one side of the Basilica are bronze effigies of Charles and Isabella, with effigies of their daughter Maria of Austria and Charles's sisters Eleanor of Austria and Maria of Hungary behind them. Adjacent to them on the opposite side of the Basilica are effigies of their son Philip with three of his wives and their ill-fated grandson Carlos, Prince of Asturias.

== Administration ==
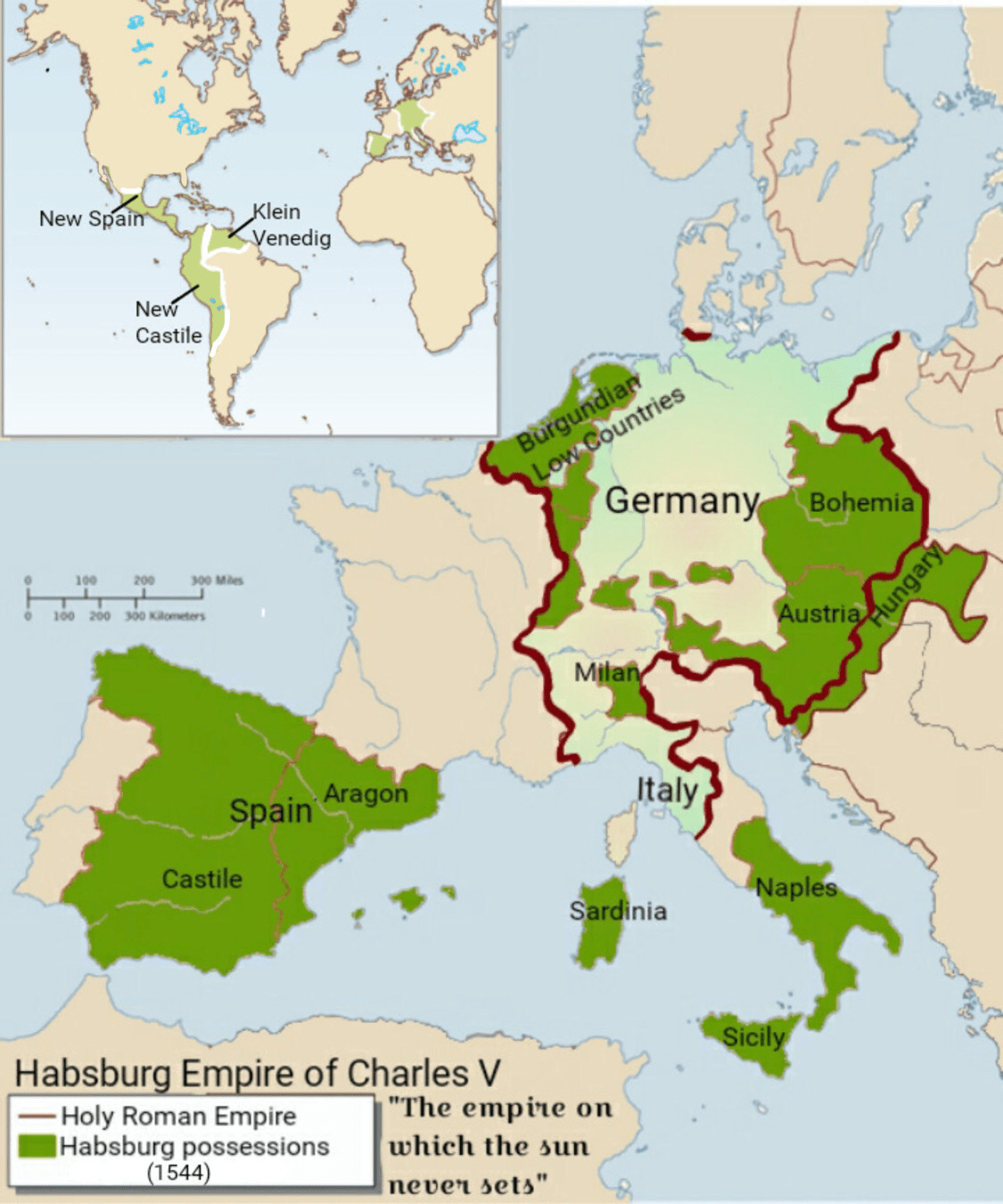
The Empire of Charles V at its peak, with the Americas an ocean away from his European realms

Given the vast dominions of the House of Habsburg, Charles was often on the road and needed deputies to govern his realms for the times he was absent from his territories. His first Governor of the Habsburg Netherlands was Margaret of Austria, Duchess of Savoy, succeeded by his sister Mary of Hungary and Emmanuel Philibert, Duke of Savoy. His first Regent of Spain was Adrian of Utrecht (succeeded by Isabella of Portugal and Philip II of Spain). For the regency and governorship of the Austrian hereditary lands, Charles named his brother Ferdinand archduke in the Austrian lands under his authority at the Diet of Worms (1521).

Charles agreed to favour the election of Ferdinand as King of the Romans in Germany, which took place in 1531. By virtue of these agreements, Ferdinand became Holy Roman Emperor and obtained hereditary rights over Austria at the abdication of Charles in 1556. Charles de Lannoy, Carafa and Antonio Folc de Cardona y Enriquez were viceroys of the kingdoms of Naples, Sicily and Sardinia, respectively.

Charles V travelled ten times to the Low Countries, nine to Germany, seven to Spain, seven to Italy, four to France, two to England, and two to North Africa. During all his travels, the Emperor left a documentary trail in almost every place he went, allowing historians to surmise that he spent 10,000 days in the Low Countries, 6,500 days in Spain, 3,000 days in Germany, and 1,000 days in Italy. He spent 195 days in France, 99 in North Africa and 44 days in England. For 260 days, his exact location is unrecorded, all of them being days spent at sea travelling between his dominions. As he put it in his last public speech: "my life has been one long journey".

Charles never travelled to his overseas possessions in the Americas, since a transatlantic crossing to a place not central to his political interests at the time was unthinkable.

The New World was an increasingly important part of the balance of power, but it was completely subordinate to European considerations. The Spanish colonial empire took up relatively little of Charles V's time. Its principal function was to provide resources to support his ambitions on the near side of the Atlantic: again and again, it was bullion from the Indies – a fifth of total revenue – which either funded campaigns against the French, Turks, and German princes directly or provided the security against which the Emperor could borrow the great banking Fugger family in Augsburg. For example, of nearly 2 million escudos' worth of treasury, the largest recipient was Germany, followed by the Low Countries. Charles's travels throughout his reign also show his priority quite clearly: he visited Italy on seven occasions, France on four, and England and Africa on two, and spent six long stays in Spain itself, but he travelled to Flanders and Germany on no fewer than nineteen occasions; he never visited the Americas. His imperial status stemmed from the Imperium Romanum, not the global sweep of his lands. In short, the Holy Roman Empire, not the emerging Spanish empire, provided the Imperial context in which the ambitions of Charles V played out.

— Europe, the Struggle for Supremacy, 1453 to the Present, p. 87, Brendan Simms

He did, however, establish strong administrative structures to rule them, including the European-based Council of the Indies in 1524 and the establishment of the Viceroyalty of New Spain and the Viceroyalty of Peru when the Aztec and Inca civilisations were conquered in his name.

In 1534, Charles accepted a personal audience with Maxixcatzin, a nobleman from Tlaxcala who demanded and received several special privileges for his city and its people. The Tlaxcallans had formed an alliance with Spain and were instrumental in the overthrow of the Aztecs and other conquests in the Americas. Charles' decrees recognised their contributions and promised that Tlaxcala's autonomy would be preserved. His treatment of the Tlaxcallans and other friendly native peoples as important allies rather than conquered subjects ensured strong support from Tlaxcala and other allied native groups for the next three centuries.

=== Europe ===
==== Military system ====
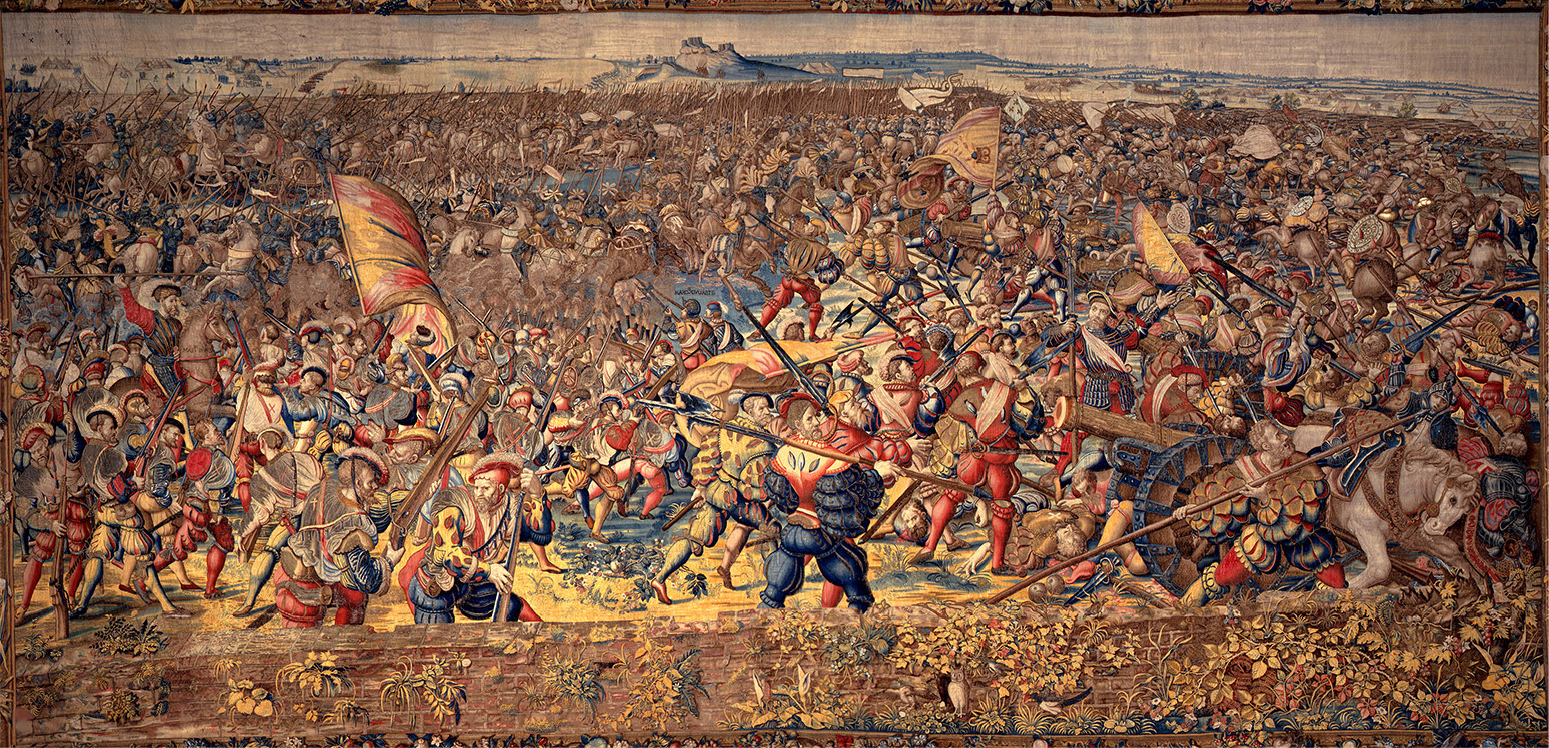
The second tapestry in the series Battle of Pavia by Bernard van Orley: The Marquis of Pescara leading an Imperial attack on the French cavalry and Georg von Frundsberg leading the Landsknechte against the French artillery.

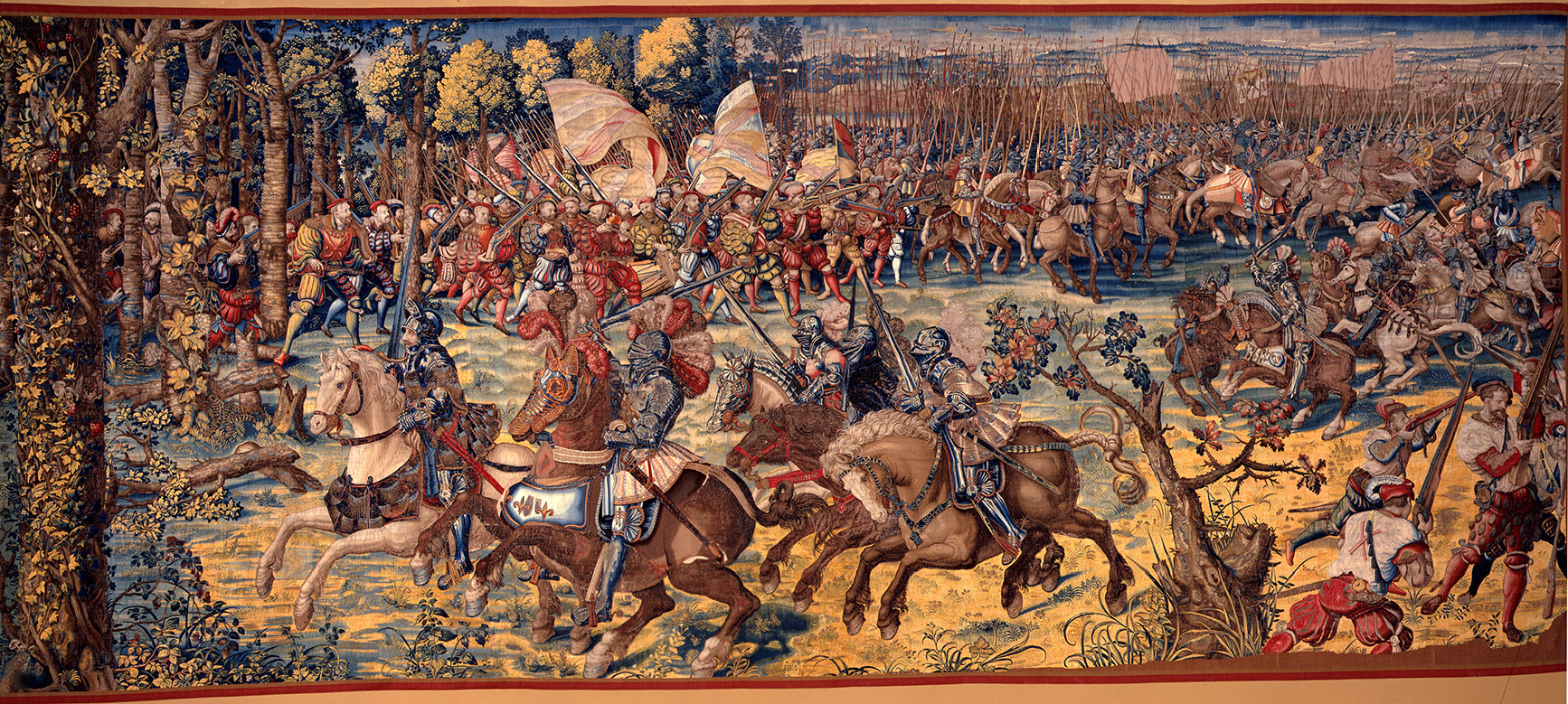
Heavy cavalry at the Battle of Pavia

Under the organisation and patronage of Maximilian I, Southern Germany had become the leading arms industry region of the 16th century, rivalled only by Northern Italy with the chief centers being Nuremberg, Augsburg, Milan, and Brescia. Charles V continued with the development of mass production and standardization of gun caliber, which greatly affected warfare.

The Helmschmied of Augsburg and the Filippo Negroli of Milan were among the foremost families of armourers of the time. Under Charles V, the Spanish arms industry was significantly expanded, with significant improvements of muskets.

The Landsknechte, originally recruited and organised by Maximilian and Georg von Frundsberg, formed the bulk of Charles V's army. They surpassed the Swiss mercenaries in quality and quantity as the "best and most easily available mercenaries in Europe". They were considered best fighting troops in the first half of the 16th century for their brutal and ruthless efficiency, with a French saying going "a Landsknecht thrown out of heaven couldn't get in hell because he would frighten the devil".

Terrence McIntosh notes that Charles V, like his grandfather, "relied heavily on German military manpower, fearsome landsknechts, as well as redoubtable Swiss-German mercenaries. Maximilian invaded northern Italy in 1496, 1508, and repeatedly between 1509 and 1516. Soon after the Imperial election in 1519, Charles V was waging war there. His overwhelmingly German troops won the Battle of Pavia and captured the French king in 1525; two years later, they sacked the city of Rome, murdering between six and twelve thousand residents and pillaging for eight months."

His expansionist and aggressive policy, in combination with the brutal behaviours of the Landsknechte, which incidentally happened right at the formation of the early modern German nation, left an indelible mark on his neighbours' impression of the German polity, despite the fact that, in the long term, it was in general not belligerent.

Charles V also favoured German heavy cavalry, although costly. Many cavalrymen and noblemen fighting for Charles V were of Burgundian extraction, often part of the Order of the Golden Fleece. Italian condottieri were also recruited.

In Spain, inheriting the reform work of Gonzalo Fernández de Córdoba, in 1536, Charles reorganised his infantry and created the first units of the tercios. Later they became "the most formidable fighting force of the sixteenth century". The original tercios were exclusively Spanish and this situation remained until Philip II organized the Italian tercios in 1584.

==== Finance ====
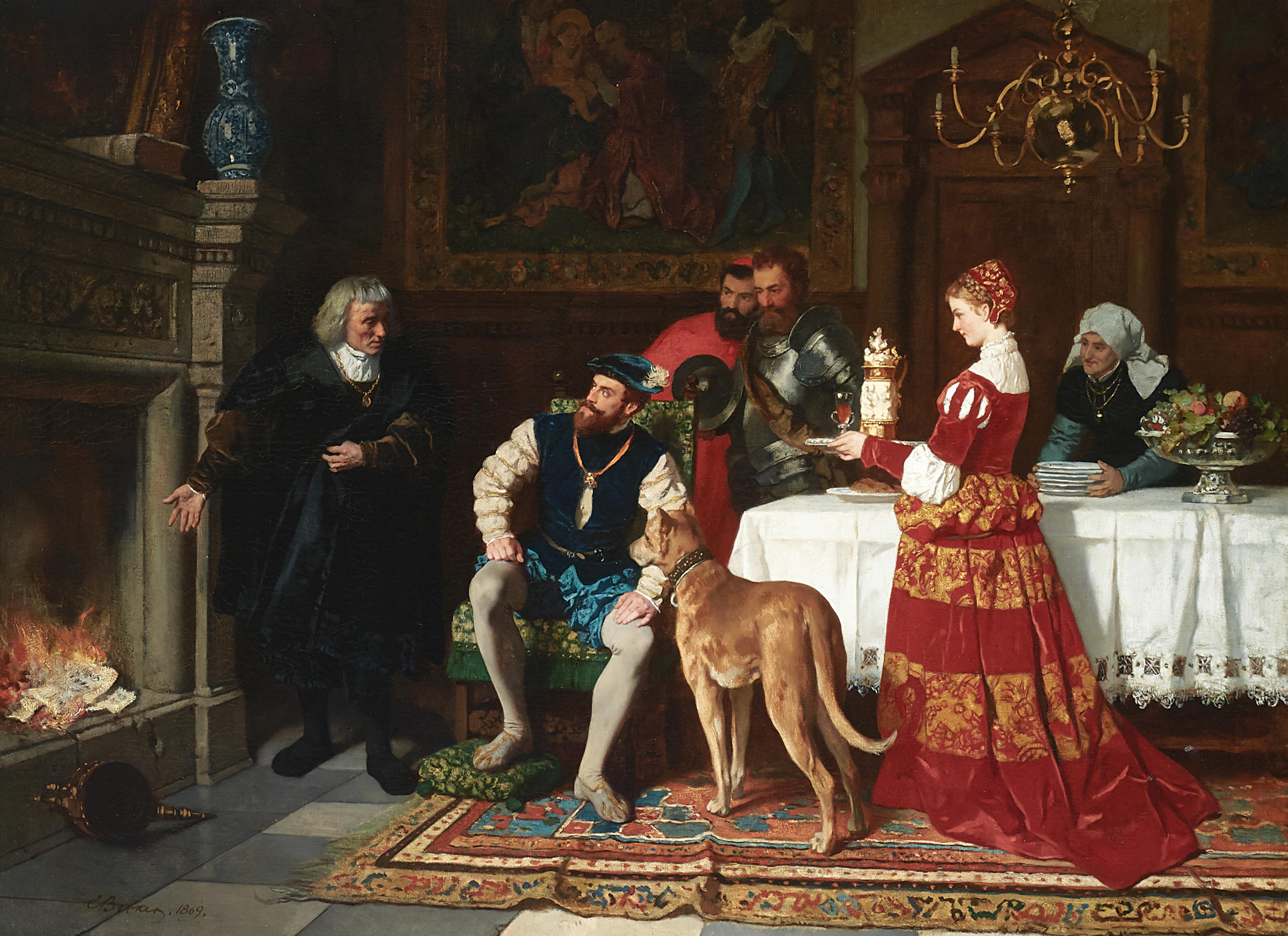
Anton Fugger burning the debenture bonds of Charles V in 1535, a portrait by Karl Ludwig Friedrich Becker

Charles's main sources of revenue were from Castile, Naples and the Low Countries, which yielded in total an annual amount of around 2.8 million Spanish ducats in the 1520s and about 4.8 million Spanish ducats in the 1540s. Ferdinand I's annual revenue totalled between 1.7 million and 1.9 million Venetian ducats (2.15–2.5 million florin or Rhine gulden). Their chief enemy, the Ottomans, had a more streamlined and profitable system, yielding 10 million gold ducats in 1527–1528 and did not suffer from a deficit.

He often had to depend on loans from bankers. He borrowed 28 million ducats in total during his reign, of which 5.5 million ducats came from the Fuggers and 4.2 million from the Welsers of Augsburg. Other creditors were from Genoa, Antwerp and Spain.

==== Communication, diplomatic, and espionage systems ====
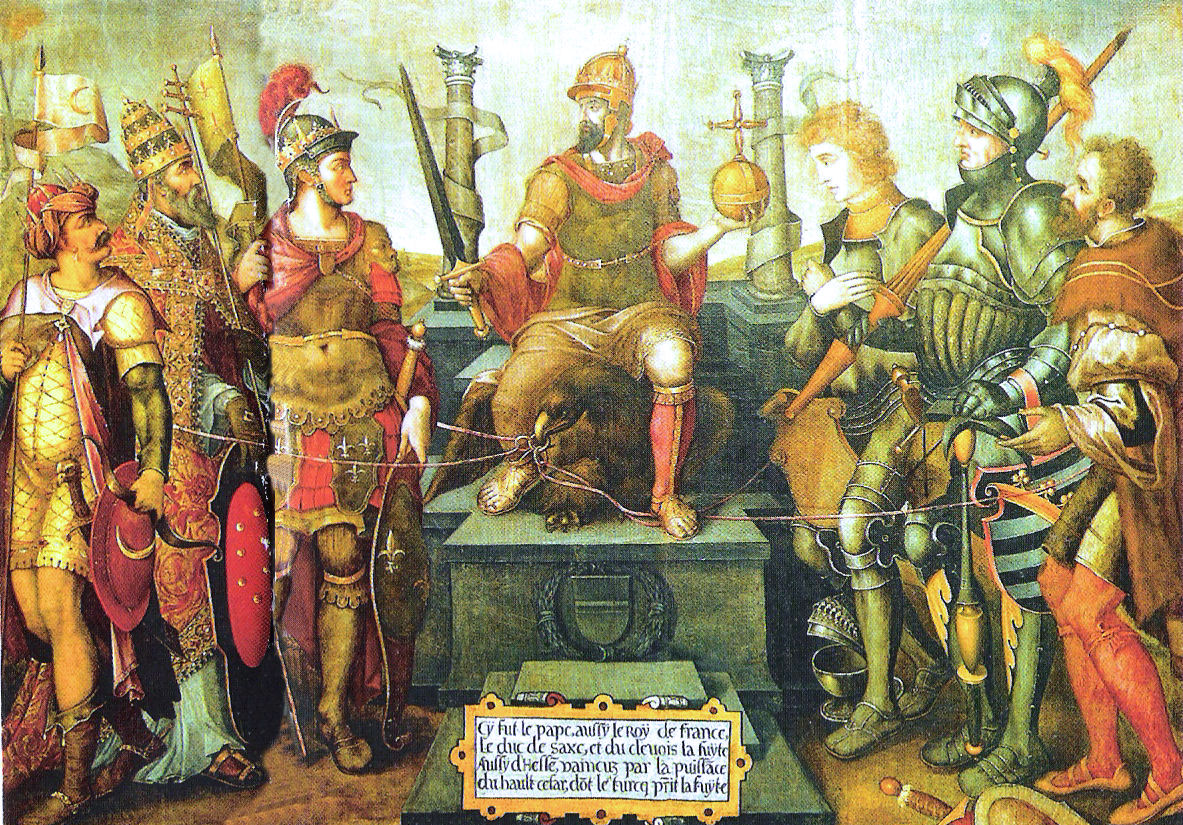
Allegory of the reign of Charles V, a 16th century painting by anonymous French painter. Charles V and his enemies (from left to right): Suleiman I; Pope Clement VII; Francis I; the Duke of Cleves; the Duke of Saxony; and Philip I, Landgrave of Hesse

The Habsburg expansion and consolidation of rule was accompanied by the remarkable development of communication, diplomatic and espionage systems. In 1495, Emperor Maximilian and Franz von Taxis (from the Thurn und Taxis family) developed the Niederländische Postkurs, a postal system that connected the Low Countries with Innsbruck. The system quickly converged with the European trade system and an emerging market for news, spurring a pan-Europe communication revolution.

The system was developed further by Philip the Handsome, who negotiated new standards for the systems with the Taxis, and unified communication between Germany, the Netherlands, France and Spain by adding stations in Granada, Toledo, Blois, Paris and Lyon in 1505.

After his father's death, Charles, as Duke of Burgundy, continued to develop the system. Behringer notes that, "Whereas the status of private mail remains unclear in the treaty of 1506, it is obvious from the contract of 1516 that the Taxis company had the right to carry mail and keep the profit as long as it guaranteed the delivery of court mail at clearly defined speeds, regulated by time sheets to be filled in by the post riders on the way to their destination. In return, imperial privileges guaranteed exemption from local taxes, local jurisdiction, and military service. 21 The terminology of the early modern communications system and the legal status of its participants were invented at these negotiations." He confirmed Jannetto's son Giovanni Battista de Tassis as Postmaster General (chief et maistre general de noz postes par tous noz royaumes, pays, et seigneuries) in 1520. By Charles V's time, "the Holy Roman Empire had become the centre of the European communication universe."

Charles V inherited efficient multinational diplomatic networks from both the Trastámara and Habsburg-Burgundian dynasties. Following the example of the papal curia, in the late fifteenth century, both dynasties began to employ permanent envoys, earlier than other secular powers. The Habsburg network developed in parallel to their postal system. Charles V combined the Spanish and the Imperial systems into one.

His opponents, chiefly France, found a counterweight, though, by the alliance with the Ottoman Empire, which Francis I admitted to be the only force that could prevent the Habsburgs from transforming European states into a Europe-wide empire. Charles V's military might frightened other European rulers, while he was able to make the pope a reluctant agent, like his grandfather Ferdinand had done; no lasting alliance could be achieved. After the Battle of Pavia, the European rulers united to prevent harsh terms from being placed upon France.

In the 1530s, in the context of the conflict between the Habsburg Empire and its greatest opponent, the Ottomans, an espionage network was built by Charles and Don Alfonso Granai Castriota, the marquis of Atripalda, who conducted its operations. Naples became the main rearguard of the system. Gennaro Varriale writes that, "on the eve of the Tunis campaign, Emperor Charles V possessed a network of spies based in the Kingdom of Naples that watched over all the corners of the Ottoman Empire."

==== Patronage of the arts and architecture ====
Several notable men were recognised with patronage by Charles. Noted Spanish poet Garcilaso de la Vega, a nobleman and ambassador in the Imperial court of Charles, was first appointed contino (imperial guard) of the Emperor in 1520. Alfonso de Valdés, twin brother of the humanist Juan de Valdés and secretary of the Emperor, was a Spanish humanist. Peter Martyr d'Anghiera, an Italian historian at the service of Spain, wrote the first accounts of explorations in Central and South America in a series of letters and reports, grouped in the original Latin publications of 1511 to 1530 into sets of ten chapters called "decades". His Decades are of great value in the history of geography and discovery. His De Orbe Novo (On the New World, 1530) describes the first contacts of Europeans and Native Americans, Native American civilisations in the Caribbean and North America, as well as Mesoamerica, and includes, for example, the first European reference to India rubber.

Martyr was given the post of chronicler (cronista) in the newly formed Council of the Indies (1524), commissioned by Charles V to describe what was occurring in the explorations of the New World. In 1523, Charles gave him the title of Count Palatine, and in 1524 called him once more into the Council of the Indies. Martyr was invested by Pope Clement VII, as proposed by Charles V, as Abbot of Jamaica. Juan Boscán Almogáver was a poet who participated with Garcilaso de la Vega in giving naval assistance to the Isle of Rhodes during a Turkish invasion in 1522. Boscán fought against the Turks again in 1532 with Álvarez de Toledo and Charles in Vienna. During this period, Boscán had made serious progress in his mastery of verse in the Italian style.

Charles commissioned several portraits from the painter Titian, including the Portrait of Charles V and the Equestrian Portrait of Charles V, becoming a friend of the artist. These portraits helped to spread the image of Charles as a powerful ruler and protector of Christendom, promoting his image as an enlightened Renaissance ruler.

The building of the Palace of Charles V was commissioned by Charles, who wished to establish his residence close to the Alhambra palaces. Although the Catholic Monarchs had already altered some rooms of the Alhambra after the conquest of the city in 1492, Charles V intended to construct a permanent residence befitting an emperor. The project was given to Pedro Machuca, an architect whose life and development are poorly documented. At the time, Spanish architecture was immersed in the Plateresque style, with traces of Gothic architecture still visible. Machuca built a palace corresponding stylistically to Mannerism, a mode then in its infancy in Italy. The exterior of the building uses a typical Renaissance combination of rustication on the lower level and ashlar on the upper. The building has never been a home to a monarch and stood roofless until 1957.

=== Americas ===
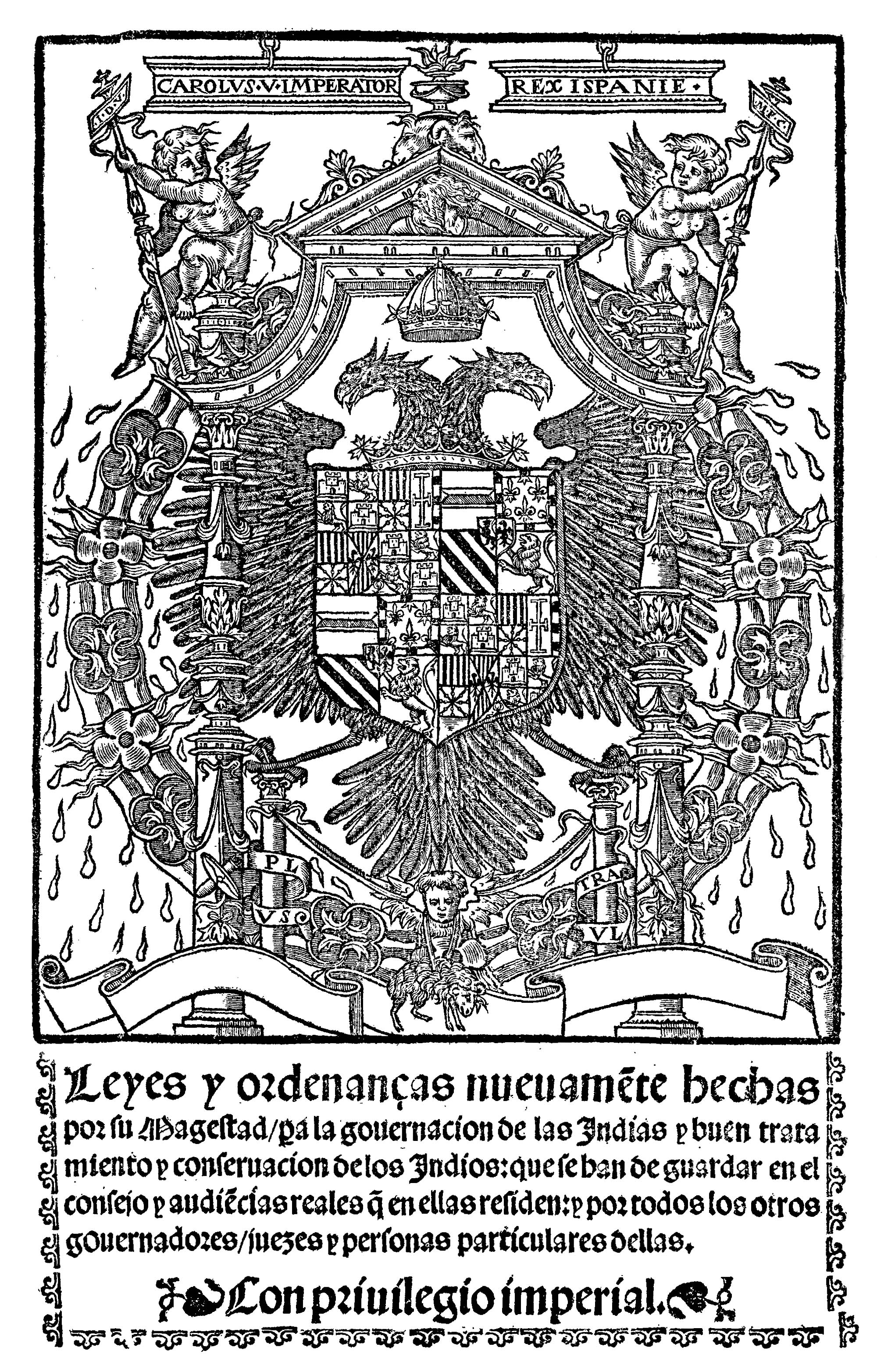
The frontispiece of the 1542 New Laws issued by Charles V, Emperor and King of Spain

From his maternal grandmother, Isabella I of Castile, who had funded Christopher Columbus's first voyage in 1492, Charles inherited Castile's overseas territories in the Americas. Spanish colonization of the Americas began in 1493, but these permanent settlements in the Caribbean and Spanish Main were marginal to Charles's European empire and not the focus of his attention. Through the Treaty of Tordesillas (1494), Spain and Portugal had agreed on a division of overseas territories, so that with the exception of Brazil, which Portugal could claim, Charles could claim the rest of the New World.

The realm of his known possessions expanded with the Spanish conquest of the Aztec Empire (1519–1521) under conquistador Hernán Cortés and by Magellan's circumnavigation of the globe in 1522. These successes convinced Charles of his divine mission to become the leader of Christendom, which still perceived a significant threat from Islam. The conquest of central Mexico, bringing a high indigenous civilisation under Spanish rule, compelled Charles to grapple with creating structures of institutional rule in the Americas. Charles had begun creating councils to oversee aspects of his realms, first reorganising the existing Council of Castile, established by the Catholic Monarchs. Indicating the Americas' eventual importance, he founded the Council of the Indies in 1524 to deal with the complexities of Castile's overseas possessions.

Unlike his European possessions, which were not consolidated geographically but were all relatively near each other, ruling the Americas required taking into account the Atlantic Ocean. Prior to the creation of the viceroyalties, he established a high court audiencia to administer justice. He formalised the conversion of indigenous populations to Christianity, the so-called "spiritual conquest", by sending Franciscan, Dominican, and Augustinian friars starting in the mid-1520s. With the discovery of large deposits of silver in northern Mexico in the 1540s and in 1545 in Peru at Potosí, Charles's advisors urged regulation of mining to ensure that bullion was directed to crown coffers.

Ad hoc administrative solutions of the early conquest period gave way to Charles's establishment of the Viceroyalty of New Spain in Mexico City (1535), the Spanish capital founded on the ruins of the Aztec capital of Tenochtitlan. After the Spanish conquest of the Inca Empire in the 1530s, Charles established the Viceroyalty of Peru in the newly founded Spanish capital of Lima (1544). As it became clear that establishing royal control was important, Charles sought to undermine the growing power of the group of conquistadors in Mexico and Peru, awarded personal grants of indigenous labour in perpetuity, by issuing the New Laws of 1542, ending grant holders' rights in perpetuity.

Dominican friar Bartolomé de las Casas's long term campaign to protect indigenous populations from Spanish conquerors' exploitation influenced Charles's new policy. In Peru, it resulted in a major Spanish rebellion against the crown when the newly appointed viceroy, Blasco Núñez Vela, attempted to implement the measure. In Mexico, Viceroy don Antonio de Mendoza prudently did not. In Peru, the new viceroy was murdered. "To many Spanish settlers, the New Laws seemed like a declaration of war, and their hostile reaction was swift and overwhelming."

The violent uprising necessitated a major military response, organised by Pedro de la Gasca, to whom Charles granted sweeping powers in order to re-establish royal authority. The rebellion in Peru coincided with one in Germany. In the Americas, Charles was forced to temper the initial order ending inheritance, allowing grants to be passed on to one further generation, but he refused to yield on the question of allowing enslavement of the indigenous.

Regarding the Spanish rebels supporting the cause of Gonzalo Pizarro, who might have set up a kingdom of Peru with himself as ruler, Charles fully supported Pizarro's beheading and his supporters' execution and confiscation of property. This was similar to the treatment of comunero rebels early in his Iberian rule. Pizarro's execution marks the end of the Spanish rebellion against the crown. Relatively early in his rule, Charles assigned a concession (1528) in Venezuela Province to Bartholomeus V. Welser, in compensation for his inability to repay debts owed. The concession, known as Klein-Venedig (little Venice), was revoked in 1546 during the rebellion in Peru by Spanish colonists against Charles.

The question of labour and treatment of indigenous populations had occupied Charles's maternal grandparents, and as indigenous populations in the Caribbean were decimated by disease and overwork, transhipment of African slaves to replace the labour force began. On 28 August 1518, Charles issued a charter authorising the transportation of slaves directly from Africa to the Americas. Up until that point (since at least 1510), African slaves had usually been transported to Castile or Portugal and had then been transshipped to the Caribbean. Charles's decision to create a direct, more economically viable Africa to America slave trade fundamentally changed the nature and scale of the transatlantic slave trade.

Protection of indigenous populations against Spaniards' exploitation was the key motivation behind Charles's issuance of the 1542 New Laws. With Gasca's suppression of the Spanish colonists' rebellion in Peru, Charles was still concerned about the welfare of his indigenous subjects. So, on 3 July 1549, Charles ordered the Council of the Indies to stop all the conquests until it was certain that Spain was acting in accordance with the moral law, so penetration into the American continent was suspended until 1556. This was because philosophical questions arose, especially from Catholic jurists and scholastic philosophers, about whether the Hispanic Monarchy had the moral right to legally conquer the Indies.

Since 1542, a moral crisis has been developing in the government because of the Spanish colonisation in America. The Crown of Castile was overwhelmed by the constant denunciations of abuses it was receiving, especially from the conquests in Peru and those that occurred in the New Kingdom of Granada, which could cause anguish in people of all Estates, even if they were prelates or knights of the Spanish nobility. Thus, Charles, influenced by the reflections of Francisco de Vitoria and the School of Salamanca, together with the pressure of missionaries, wanted to be sure that their power was beyond reproach. Therefore, it was ordered to stop all military companies in the overseas domains until a board of wise men ruled on the fairest way to carry them out, seriously considering the total or partial abandonment of the New World until the imperial doubt was resolved, regarding how to avoid in the future the possibility of abusive discoveries, overwhelming conquests and predatory colonizations that were based on the oppressive exploitation of indigenous labor.

In 1550, Charles convened a conference at Valladolid in order to consider the morality of the force used against the indigenous populations of the New World, which included figures such as Bartolomé de las Casas, from which conceptions of the human rights of the Indians would arise according to the Thomistic natural law, making the Hispanic Monarchy a pioneer, both in theory and in practice, on how to approach respect for the conquered. Theologians and jurists from all parts of the empire began to arrive in the capital, presenting themselves with the best souls of Spain, such as Domingo de Soto, Bartolomé Carranza, Melchor Cano, and also Pedro de la Gasca (Peru's first peacemaker after Civil Wars between the conquerors of Peru) together with the jurisconsults of the Council of the Indies.

Bartolomé de las Casas defended the position that the wars of conquest were unjust, while Juan Ginés de Sepúlveda defended the opposite. The court, after long debates, voted and tied, so there was no official sentence, but there were several binding reports in which the purpose was to ensure that the treatment given to the natives was correct. It was the first time that kings and philosophers conceded that men have fundamental rights for the mere fact of being men (Jus gentium), rights of the eternal Law that are prior to any positive law written in the treaties. Never before had a European people wondered in such depth where their own rights of the victor ended, and where the rights of the defeated begin.

Finally, Spain did not abandon the Indies, largely based on the sayings of Vitoria: "After many barbarians have converted there, it would not be convenient or lawful for the prince to abandon the administration of those provinces." Therefore, Spanish rule was maintained as Sepúlveda claimed, but it was recognised that the Indians were people with their own rights as de las Casas paid for and enshrined in the New Laws, together with the papal bull Sublimis Deus. Given this, there were no longer talks about conquest, but about pacification, so urbanisation was resumed, with specific instructions to avoid harm to the Indians. The regulations on how to act in the future, in terms of discoveries and colonisations, were the following:

In the discoveries: They would be made with a license from the Audiencia and carrying at least one religious designated by it. On these trips, it was forbidden to steal the goods from the natives and take them by force, except for some of them who wanted to go as interpreters. No Viceroy or Governor would undertake new voyages of discovery on their own. Neither by sea nor by land. – In the colonisations: parcels would be prohibited from the first life; Indian slaves would be freed (it was forbidden to make them slaves in the future); a revision of the repartimientos de indios (to the Audiencias) would be ordered so that those that some Spaniards had in excess would pass to the Crown; All the Indians that private individuals had without legitimate title would be transferred to the Crown; it would be forbidden to charge the natives (except where it was inexcusable); moderate rates would be imposed on taxes and services; Rates and tributes would be completely abolished in those places where the Indians had been subjected to fierce exploitation (the Antilles).

== Dynasty and private life ==
=== Education ===
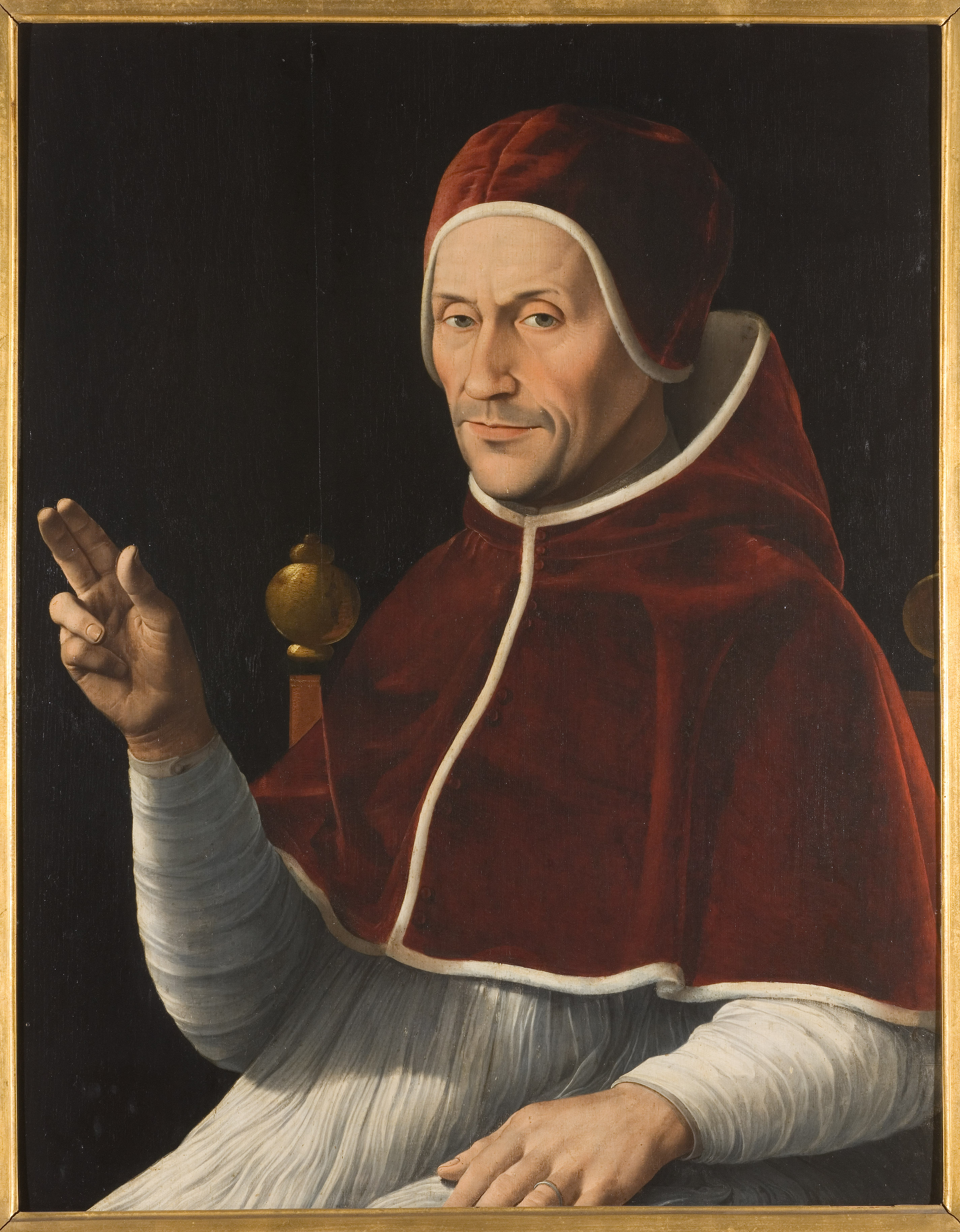
Adrian of Utrecht as Pope Adrian VI, after a portrait by Jan van Scorel (Art collection, KU Leuven)

His father's sister, Margaret, was the mother figure in his life. She had a huge influence on Charles. A canny, learned, and artistic woman, with a court that included artists Bernard van Orley and Albrecht Dürer and master tapestry-maker Pieter van Aelst, she taught her nephew "above all that a court could be a salon." She saw to his education, securing as his tutor Adrian of Utrecht, a member of the Brethren of the Common Life, which advocated simplicity and promoted a cult of indigence and deprivation. Adrian later became Pope Adrian VI. The Brethren had many important members, including Thomas à Kempis. A third major influence on Charles during his early years was William de Croÿ, Sieur de Chièves, who became his "governor and grand chamberlain", giving Charles a chivalrous education. He was a tough taskmaster, and when questioned about it, he said, "Cousin, I am the defender and guardian of his youth. I do not want him to be incapable because he has not understood affairs nor been trained to work."

=== Languages ===
Charles spoke several languages from political necessity, though he does not seem to have been a very natural linguist. He was raised speaking French, which remained his most natural language, and is used in most surviving letters handwritten by him. He learned some Dutch, being given lessons from the age of thirteen. He later added an acceptable Castilian Spanish, which he was required to learn by the Castilian Cortes Generales. He could also speak some Basque, acquired by the influence of the Basque secretaries serving in the royal court. He gained a decent command of German following the Imperial election, though he never spoke it as well as French.

By 1532, Charles was proficient in Portuguese and spoke Latin. A witticism sometimes attributed to Charles is: "I speak Spanish/Latin (depending on the source) to God, Italian to women, French to men and German to my horse." A variant of the quote is attributed to him by Jonathan Swift in his 1726 Gulliver's Travels, but there are no contemporary accounts referencing the quotation, which has many other variants and it is often attributed instead to Frederick the Great.

=== Appearance and health ===
Charles suffered from an enlarged lower jaw (mandibular prognathism), a congenital deformity that became considerably worse in later Habsburg generations, giving rise to the term Habsburg jaw. This deformity may have been caused by the family's long history of repeated intermarriages between close family members, as commonly practised in royal families of that era to maintain dynastic control of territory.

Some advisors considered him physically weak and used that as a reason for him to delay his marriage to Mary Tudor. A diplomat in Charles's court described him as "not much of a womaniser" and did not have out of wedlock children during his marriage. He suffered from fainting spells, which might have been epilepsy. He was seriously afflicted with gout, presumably caused by a diet consisting mainly of red meat.

As he aged, his gout progressed from painful to crippling. In his retirement, he was carried around the Monastery of Yuste in a sedan chair. A ramp was specially constructed to allow him easy access to his rooms.

=== Siblings ===
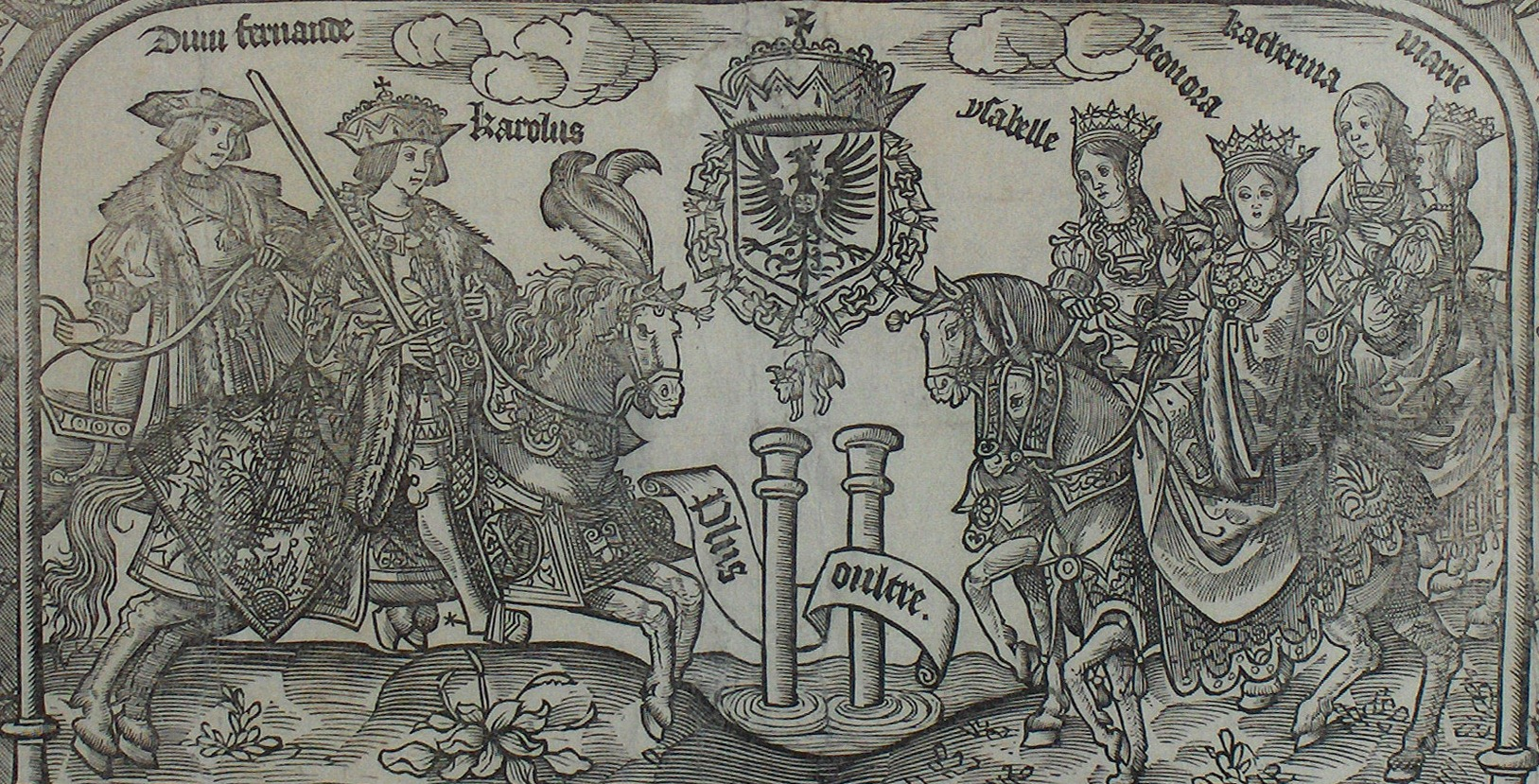
The children of Philip and Joanna

Name	Birth	Death	Notes
Eleanor	15 November 1498	25 February 1558 (aged 59)	first marriage in 1518, Manuel I of Portugal and had children; second marriage in 1530, Francis I of France and had no children.
Isabella	18 July 1501	19 January 1526 (aged 24)	married in 1515, Christian II of Denmark and had children.
Ferdinand	10 March 1503	25 July 1564 (aged 61)	married in 1521, Anna of Bohemia and Hungary and had children.
Mary	15 September 1505	18 October 1558 (aged 53)	married in 1522, Louis II of Hungary and Bohemia and had no children.
Catherine	14 January 1507	12 February 1578 (aged 71)	married in 1525, John III of Portugal and had children.

=== Marriage ===
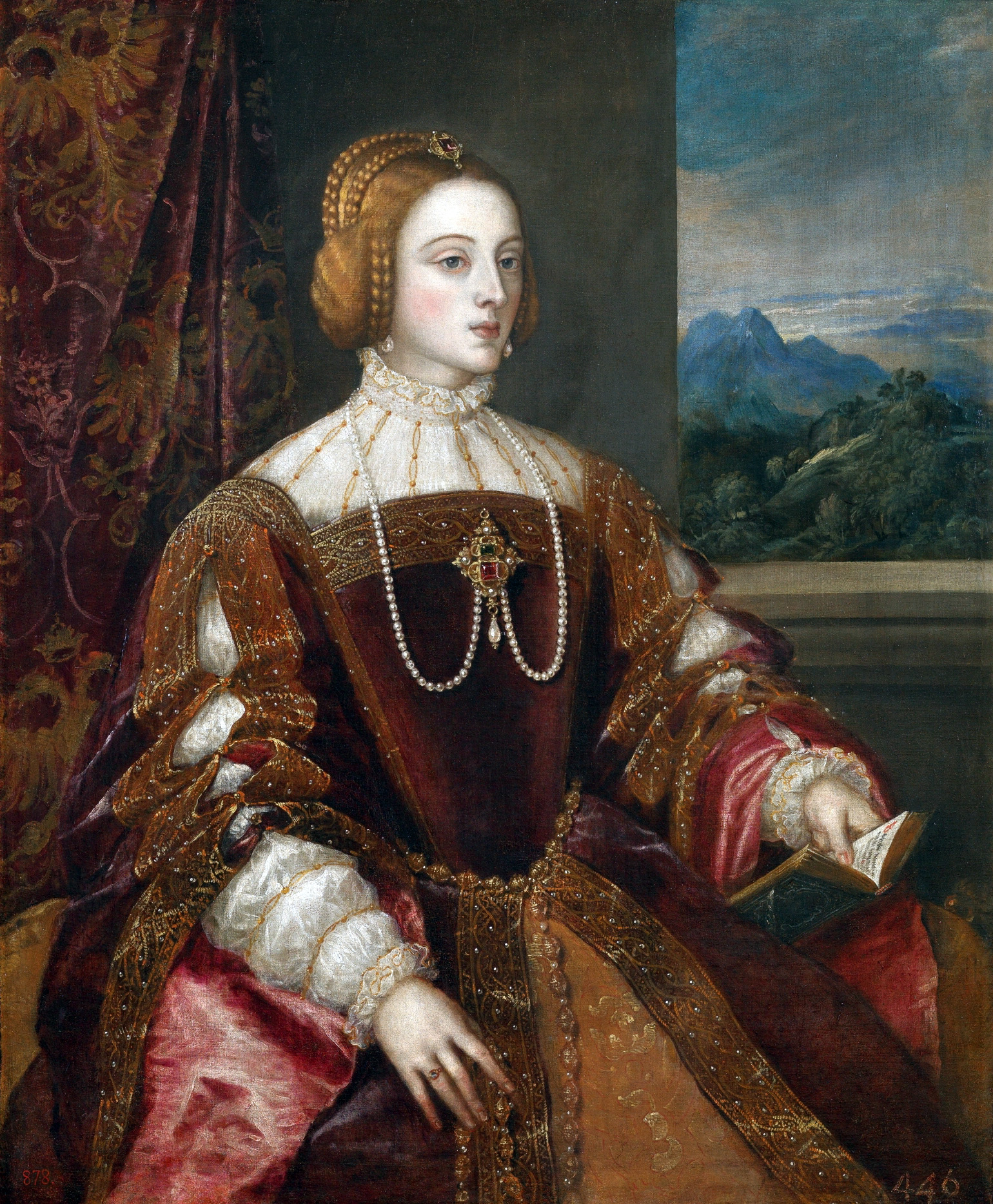
Isabella of Portugal depicting Charles' wife, a 1548 portrait by Titian

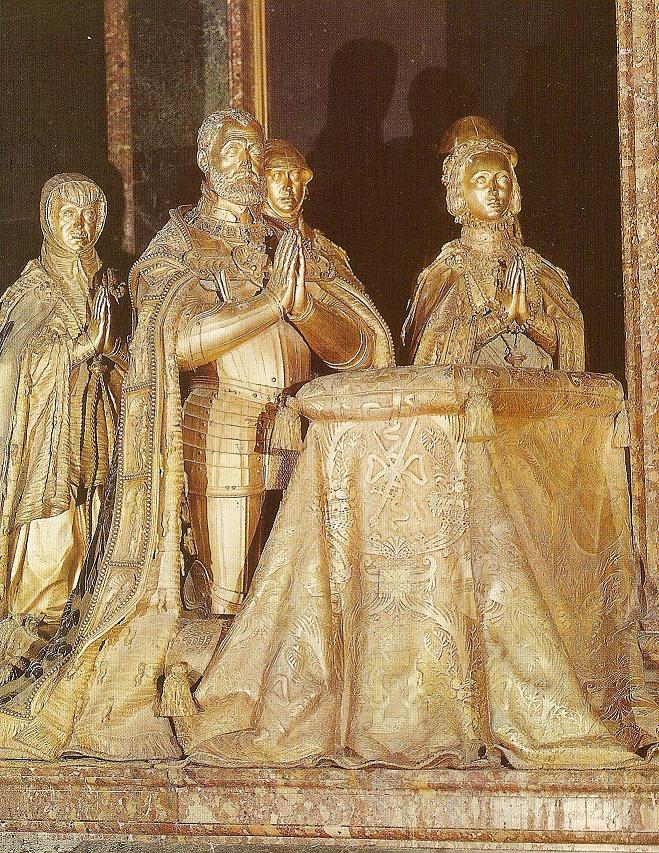
The bronze effigies of Charles and Isabella at the Basilica in El Escorial

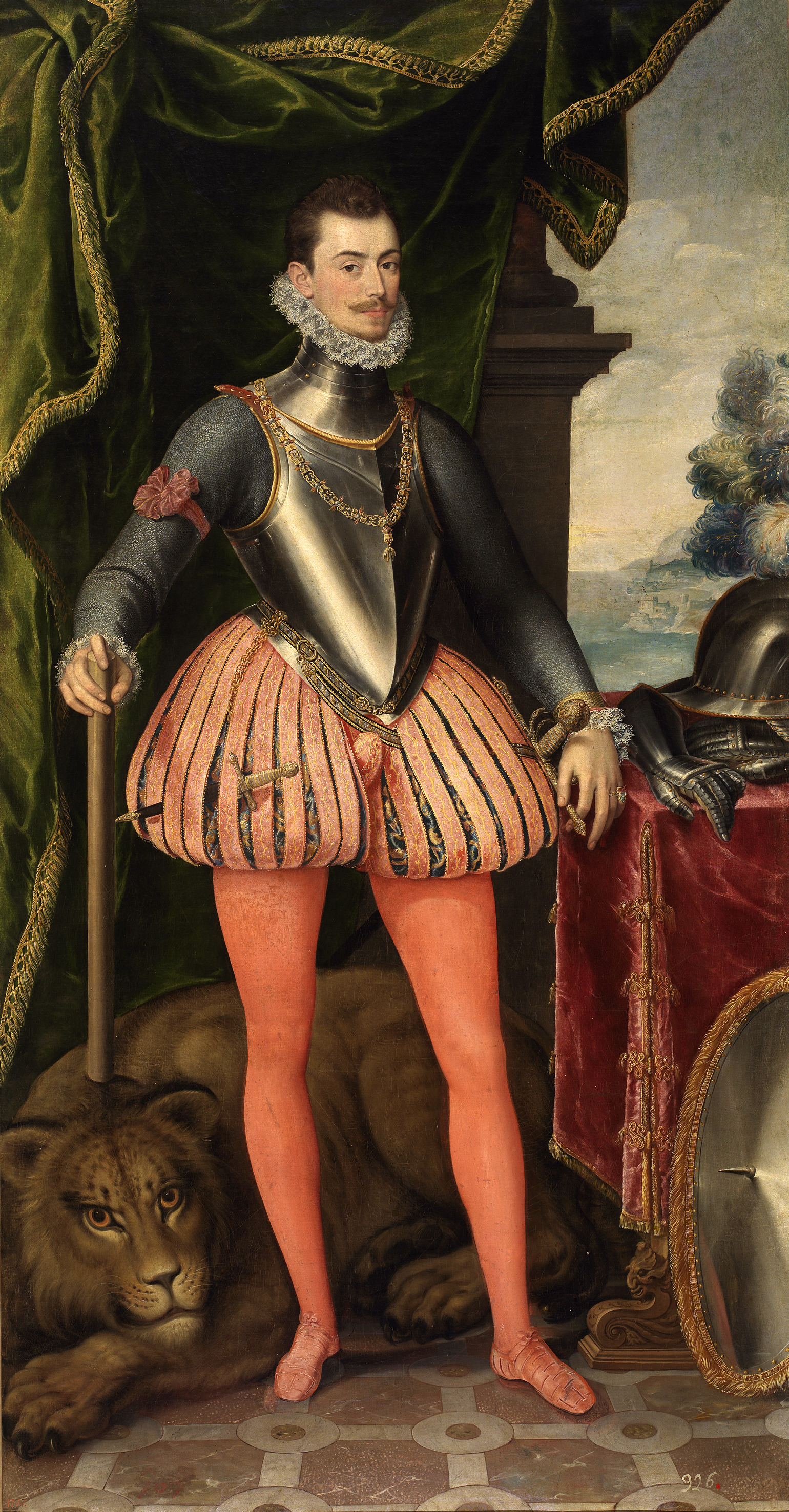
Don John of Austria, the natural son of Charles during his widowhood

On 21 December 1507, Charles was betrothed to 11-year-old Mary Tudor, Queen of France, the daughter of King Henry VII of England and younger sister to the future King Henry VIII of England, who was to take the throne in two years. The engagement was called off in 1513, on the advice of Cardinal Thomas Wolsey. Mary was instead married to King Louis XII of France in 1514.

After his ascension to the Spanish thrones of Castile and Aragon, negotiations for Charles's marriage began shortly after his arrival in Castile, with the Castilian nobles expressing their wishes for him to marry his first cousin Isabella of Portugal, the daughter of King Manuel I of Portugal and Charles's aunt Maria of Aragon. The nobles desired Charles's marriage to a princess of Castilian blood, and a marriage to Isabella would have secured an alliance between Castile and Portugal. The 18-year-old King was in no hurry to marry and ignored the nobles' advice, exploring other marriage options. Instead of marrying Isabella, he sent his sister Eleanor to marry Isabella's widowed father, King Manuel, in 1518.

In 1521, on the advice of his Flemish counsellors, especially William de Croÿ, Charles became engaged to his other first cousin, Mary, daughter of his aunt, Catherine of Aragon, and King Henry VIII, in order to secure an alliance with England. However, this engagement was very problematic because Mary was only six years old at the time, sixteen years Charles's junior, which meant that he would have to wait for her to be old enough to marry.

By 1525, Charles could not wait any longer to marry and have legitimate children as heirs. He had abandoned the idea of an English alliance, cancelled his engagement to Mary and decided to marry Isabella and form an alliance with Portugal. He wrote to Isabella's brother, King John III of Portugal, making a double marriage contract – Charles would marry Isabella and John would marry Charles's youngest sister, Catherine.

A marriage to Isabella was more beneficial for Charles, as she was closer to him in age, was fluent in Spanish and provided him with a very handsome dowry of 900,000 doblas de oro castellanas, which would help to solve the financial problems brought on by the Italian Wars. The marriage brought him the additional titles as "monarch of the Canaries [Canary Islands] and of the [Portuguese] Indies, the isles of mainland, and the Ocean Sea." Marrying Isabella would allow Charles to have her serve as regent in Spain whenever he left. Ultimately, this union would result in their son Philip having the strongest claim to the Portuguese throne when the House of Aviz died out in 1580, resulting in the Iberian Union.

On 10 March 1526, Charles and Isabella met at the Alcázar of Seville. The marriage was originally a political arrangement, but on their first meeting, the couple fell deeply in love: Isabella captivated the Emperor with her beauty and charm. They were married that very same night in a quiet ceremony in the Hall of Ambassadors, just after midnight. Following their wedding, Charles and Isabella spent a long and happy honeymoon at the Alhambra in Granada. Charles began the construction of the Palace of Charles V in 1527, wishing to establish a permanent residence befitting an emperor and empress in the Alhambra palaces. However, the palace was not completed during their lifetimes and remained roofless until the late 20th century.

Despite the Emperor's long absences due to political affairs abroad, the marriage was considered a happy one, as both partners were always devoted and faithful to each other. The Empress acted as regent of Spain during her husband's absence, and she proved herself to be a good politician and ruler, thoroughly impressing the Emperor with many of her political accomplishments and decisions.

The marriage lasted for 13 years until Isabella's death in 1539. The Empress contracted a fever during the third month of her seventh pregnancy, which resulted in antenatal complications that caused her to miscarry a stillborn son. Her health further deteriorated due to an infection, and she died two weeks later on 1 May 1539, aged 35. Charles was left so grief-stricken by his wife's death that for two months, he shut himself up in a monastery, where he prayed and mourned for her in solitude.

Charles never recovered from Isabella's death, dressing in black for the rest of his life to show his eternal mourning, and, unlike most kings of the time, he never remarried. In memory of his wife, the Emperor commissioned the painter Titian to paint several posthumous portraits of Isabella. The finished portraits included Titian's Portrait of Isabella of Portugal and La Gloria. Charles kept these paintings with him whenever he travelled, and they were among those that he brought with him after his retirement to the Monastery of Yuste in 1557.

In 1540, Charles paid tribute to Isabella's memory when he commissioned the Flemish composer Thomas Crecquillon to compose new music as a memorial to her. Crecquillon composed his Missa Mort m'a privé in memory of the Empress. It expresses the Emperor's grief and great wish for a heavenly reunion with his beloved wife.

During his lifetime, Charles V had several nonmarital liaisons, including some that produced children. One relationship was with his step-grandmother, Germaine de Foix, which may have produced a child, Isabella of Castile. After the death of his wife, Charles "seduced Barbara Blomberg, a teenager exactly the same age as his son Philip." He kept the relationship and the existence of this out-of-wedlock son secret, "no doubt because he felt ashamed of his affair with a teenager when he was forty-six." The child named Gerónimo later became known as John of Austria; the emperor made provisions for the child in a secret codicil to his will. As with his other out-of-wedlock children, the baby was taken from the mother. He met his son once. The relationship was not revealed to his legitimate children in his lifetime, but they became aware of the relationship after his death.

=== Issue ===
Charles and Isabella had seven legitimate children, but only three of them survived to adulthood. Charles also had natural children before he married and after he was widowed:

Name	Portrait	Lifespan	Notes
Philip II of Spain		21 May 1527 – 13 September 1598	Only surviving son, successor of his father in the Spanish crowns and became king of Portugal.
Maria		21 June 1528 – 26 February 1603	Married her first cousin Maximilian II, Holy Roman Emperor.
Ferdinand		22 November 1529 – 13 July 1530	Died in infancy.
Son		29 June 1534	Stillborn.
Joanna of Austria, Princess of Portugal		24 June 1535 – 7 September 1573	Married her first cousin João Manuel, Prince of Portugal.
John		19 October 1537 – 20 March 1538	Died in infancy.
Son		21 April 1539	Stillborn.

Due to Philip II being a grandson of Manuel I of Portugal through his mother, he was in the line of succession to the throne of Portugal, and claimed it after his uncle's death, Henry, the Cardinal-King, in 1580, establishing the personal union between Spain and Portugal.

Charles also had six children out of wedlock:

- Infanta Isabella of Castile (20 August 1518 – 1537), perhaps daughter of Charles's maternal step-grandmother, Germaine of Foix, but strongly disputed by biographer Geoffrey Parker. Isabella died at the age of 19, never married, and had no issue.
- Margaret of Austria (1522–1586), daughter of Johanna van der Gheynst, a servant of Charles I de Lalaing, Seigneur de Montigny, daughter of Gilles Johann van der Gheynst and wife Johanna van der Caye van Cocamby. Married firstly with Alessandro de' Medici, Duke of Florence, and secondly with Ottavio Farnese, Duke of Parma.
- Joanna of Austria (1522–1530), daughter of Catalina de Rebolledo (or de Xériga), a lady-in-waiting of Queen Joanna I of Castile or attached to the household of Henry of Nassau. She was brought up in an Augustinian convent in Madrigal de las Altas Torres.
- Tadea of Austria (1523 – c. 1562), daughter of Orsolina della Penna. Married to Sinibaldo di Copeschi.
- Cornelis de Hooghe (1541–1583), Dutch cartographer
- John of Austria (1547–1578), victor of the Battle of Lepanto, son of Barbara Blomberg.
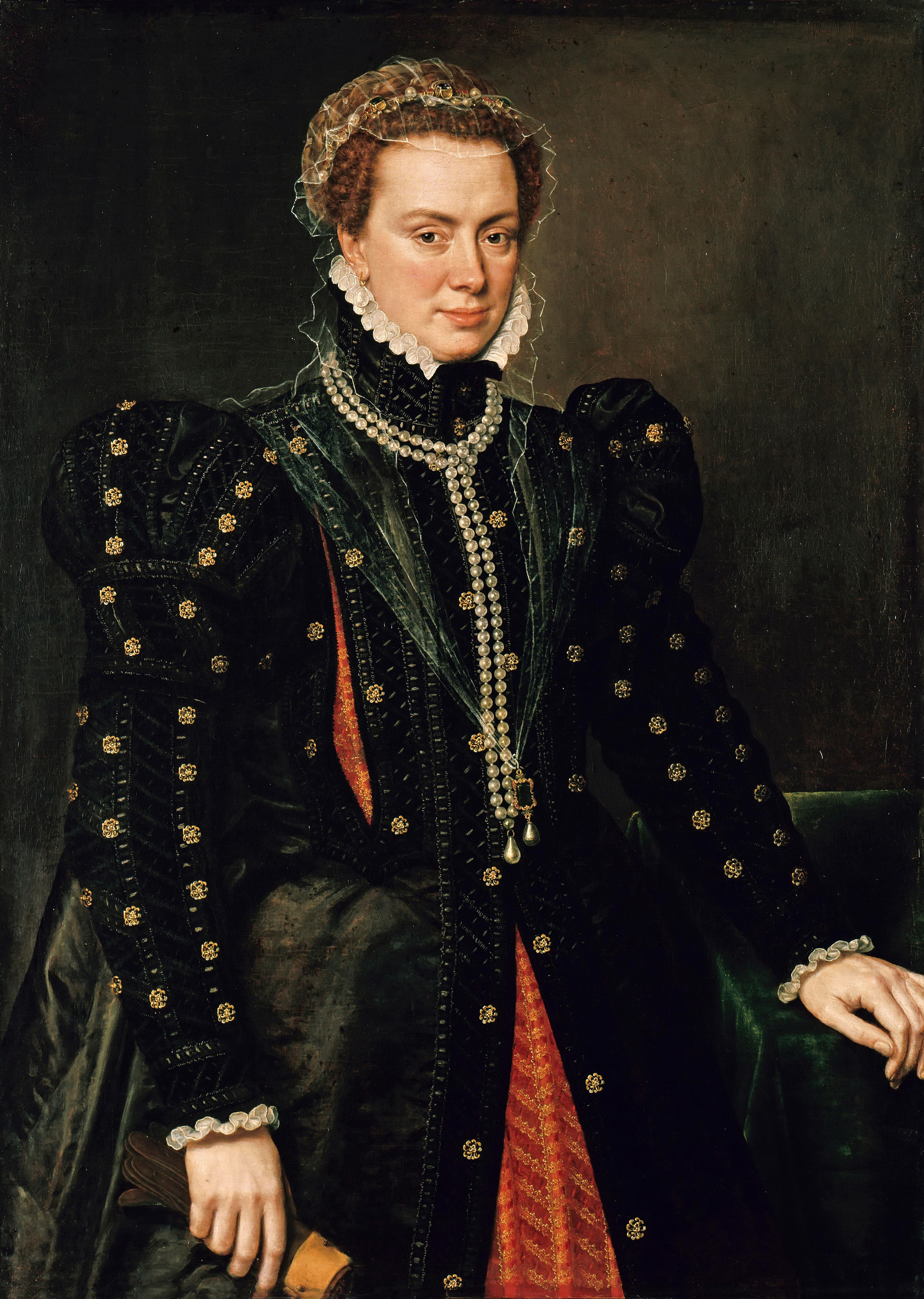
Margaret of Parma

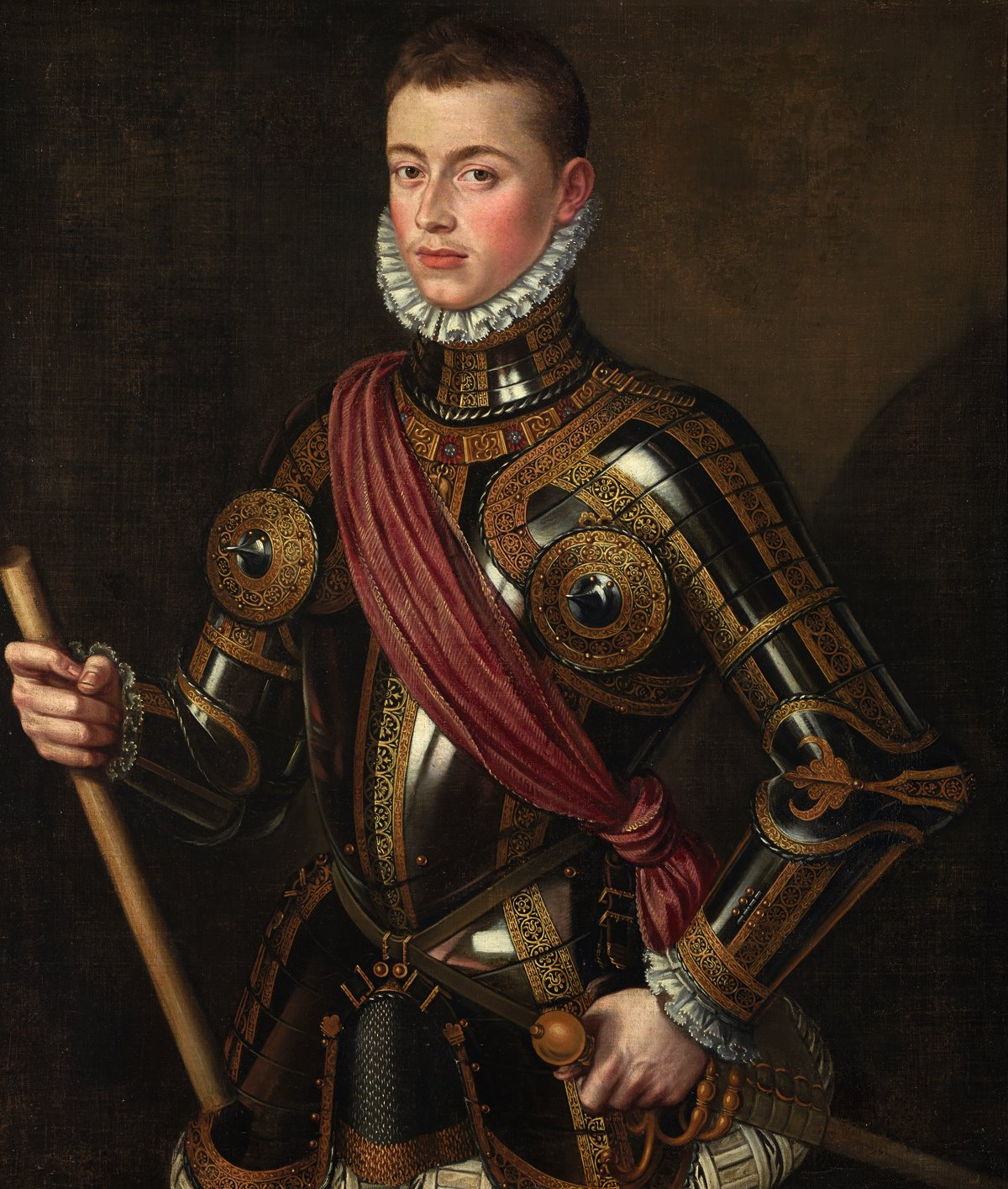
John of Austria

=== Titles and coat of arms ===
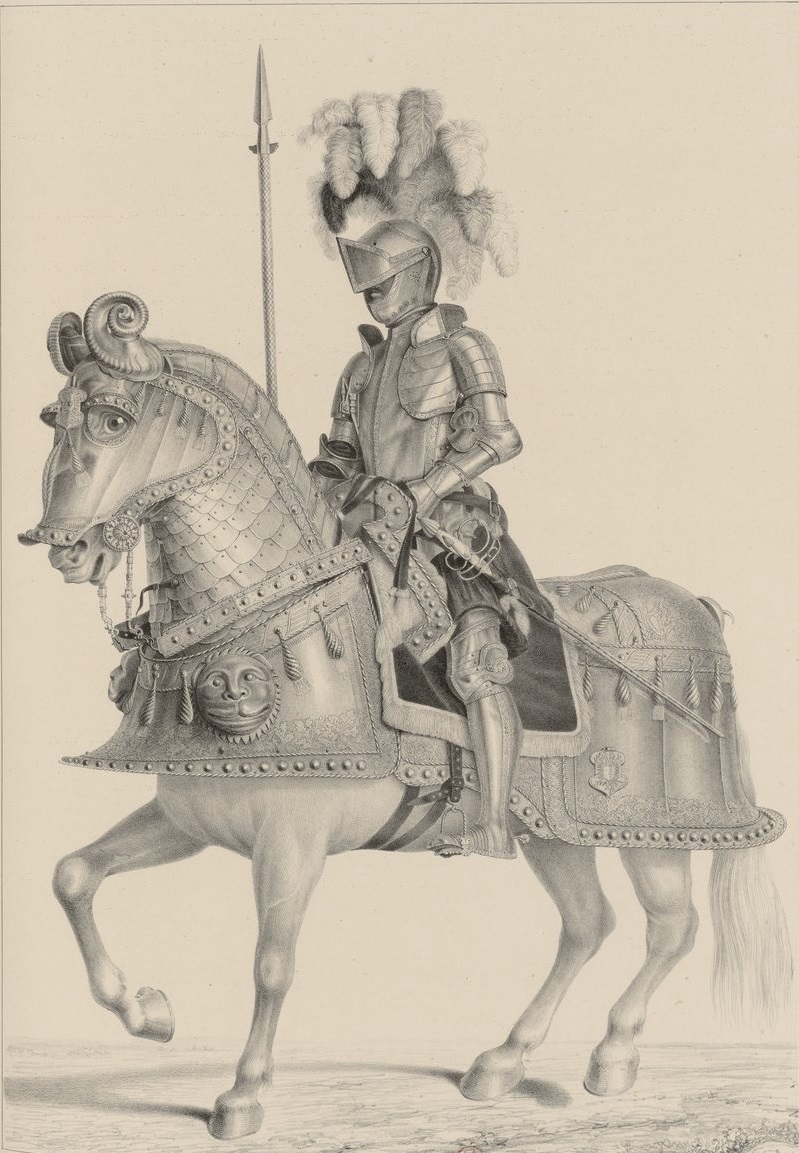
The equestrian armour of Emperor Charles V. Piece drawn from the collection of the Royal Armoury of Madrid

Charles V styled himself as Holy Roman Emperor after his election, according to a Papal dispensation conferred to the Habsburg family by Pope Julius II in 1508 and confirmed in 1519 to the prince-electors by the legates of Pope Leo X. Although Papal coronation was no longer necessary to confirm the Imperial title, Charles V was crowned in the city of Bologna by Pope Clement VII in the medieval fashion.

Charles V accumulated a large number of titles due to his vast inheritance of Burgundian, Spanish, and Austrian realms. Following the agreements known as the Pacts of Worms (21 April 1521) and Brussels (7 February 1522), he secretly gave the Austrian lands to his younger brother Ferdinand and elevated him to the status of archduke. Nevertheless, Charles also continued to style himself as archduke of Austria and maintained that Ferdinand acted as his vassal and vicar. There were restrictions on the governorship and regency of Ferdinand. For example, all of Ferdinand's letters to Charles V were signed "your obedient brother and servant". Nonetheless, the same agreements promised Ferdinand the designation as future emperor and the transfer of hereditary rights over Austria at the imperial succession.

Following the death of Louis II, King of Hungary and Bohemia, at the Battle of Mohacs in 1526, Charles V favoured the election of Ferdinand as king of Hungary (and Croatia) and Bohemia. Despite this, Charles also styled himself as king of Hungary and Bohemia and retained this titular use in official acts (such as his testament) as in the case of the Austrian lands. As a consequence, cartographers and historians have described those kingdoms both as realms of Charles V and as possessions of Ferdinand, not without confusion. Others, such as the Venetian envoys, reported that the states of Ferdinand were "all held in common with the Emperor".

Therefore, although he had agreed on the future division of the dynasty between Ferdinand and Philip II of Spain, during his own reign, Charles V conceived the existence of a single "House of Austria" of which he was the sole head. In the abdications of 1554–1556, Charles left his personal possessions to Philip II and the Imperial title to Ferdinand. The titles of king of Hungary, Croatia, etc., were also nominally left to the Spanish line (in particular to Carlos, Prince of Asturias and son of Philip II). However, Charles's Imperial abdication marked the beginning of Ferdinand's suo jure rule in Austria and his other lands: despite the claims of Philip and his descendants, Hungary and Bohemia were left under the nominal and substantial rule of Ferdinand and his successors. Formal disputes between the two lines over Hungary and Bohemia were to be solved with the Onate treaty of 1617.

As part of Andreas Palaiologos' will, he theoretically inherited the title of Eastern Roman Emperor from Ferdinand II of Aragon and Isabella I of Castille, therefore cementing the claim of the Holy Roman Empire of inheriting the Roman legacy since the Fall of Constantinople. However, the Byzantine imperial title was never formally hereditary and rested on possession of that city, which led to imperial status being claimed by the Ottoman sultans.

Charles's full titulature went as follows:

Charles, by the grace of God, Emperor of the Romans, forever August, King in (of) Germany, King of Italy, King of all Spains, of Castile, Aragon, León, of Hungary, of Dalmatia, of Croatia, Navarra, Grenada, Toledo, Valencia, Galicia, Mallorca, Sevilla, Cordova, Murcia, Jaén, Algarves, Algeciras, Gibraltar, the Canary Islands, King of both Hither and Ultra Sicily, of Sardinia, Corsica, King of Jerusalem, King of the Indies, of the Islands and Mainland of the Ocean Sea, Archduke of Austria, Duke of Burgundy, Brabant, Lorraine, Styria, Carinthia, Carniola, Limburg, Luxembourg, Gelderland, Neopatria, Württemberg, Landgrave of Alsace, Prince of Swabia, Asturia, Count of Flanders, Habsburg, Tyrol, Gorizia, Barcelona, Artois, Burgundy Palatine, Hainaut, Holland, Seeland, Ferrette, Kyburg, Namur, Roussillon, Cerdagne, Drenthe, Zutphen, Margrave of the Holy Roman Empire, Burgau, Oristano and Gociano, Lord of Frisia, the Wendish March, Pordenone, Biscay, Molina, Salins, Tripoli and Mechelen.

Title	From	To	Regnal name
Titular Duke of Burgundy	25 September 1506	25 October 1555	Charles II
Duke of Brabant	25 September 1506	25 October 1555	Charles II
Duke of Limburg	25 September 1506	25 October 1555	Charles II
Duke of Lothier	25 September 1506	25 October 1555	Charles II
Duke of Luxemburg	25 September 1506	25 October 1555	Charles III
Margrave of Namur	25 September 1506	25 October 1555	Charles II
Count Palatine of Burgundy	25 September 1506	5 February 1556	Charles II
Count of Artois	25 September 1506	25 October 1555	Charles II
Count of Charolais	25 September 1506	21 September 1558	Charles II
Count of Flanders	25 September 1506	25 October 1555	Charles III
Count of Hainault	25 September 1506	25 October 1555	Charles II
Count of Holland	25 September 1506	25 October 1555	Charles II
Count of Zeeland	25 September 1506	25 October 1555	Charles II
King of Castile and León	14 March 1516	16 January 1556	Charles I
King of Aragon	14 March 1516	16 January 1556	Charles I
King of Sicily	14 March 1516	16 January 1556	Charles I (II)
Count of Barcelona	14 March 1516	16 January 1556	Charles I
King of Sardinia	14 March 1516	16 January 1556	Charles I
King of Naples	14 March 1516	25 July 1554	Charles IV
Archduke of Austria	12 January 1519	12 January 1521	Charles I
Holy Roman Emperor	28 June 1519	27 August 1556	Charles V
King of the Romans	23 October 1520	24 February 1530	Charles V
Count of Zutphen	12 September 1543	25 October 1555	Charles II
Duke of Guelders	12 September 1543	25 October 1555	Charles III

Below is the coat of arms of Charles V according to the description: Arms of Charles added to those of Castile, Leon, Aragon, Two Sicilies and Granada present in the previous coat, those of Austria, ancient Burgundy, modern Burgundy, Brabant, Flanders and Tyrol. Charles I also incorporates the pillars of Hercules with the inscription "Plus Ultra", representing the overseas Spanish empire and surrounding coat with the collar of the Golden Fleece, as sovereign of the Order ringing the shield with the imperial crown and Acola double-headed eagle of the Holy Roman Empire and behind it the Cross of Burgundy. From 1520, added to the corresponding quarter to Aragon and Sicily, one in which the arms of Jerusalem, Naples and Navarre are incorporated.

Coat of arms of Charles I as king of Spain before becoming Holy Roman Emperor

Coat of Arms of Charles V as Holy Roman Emperor

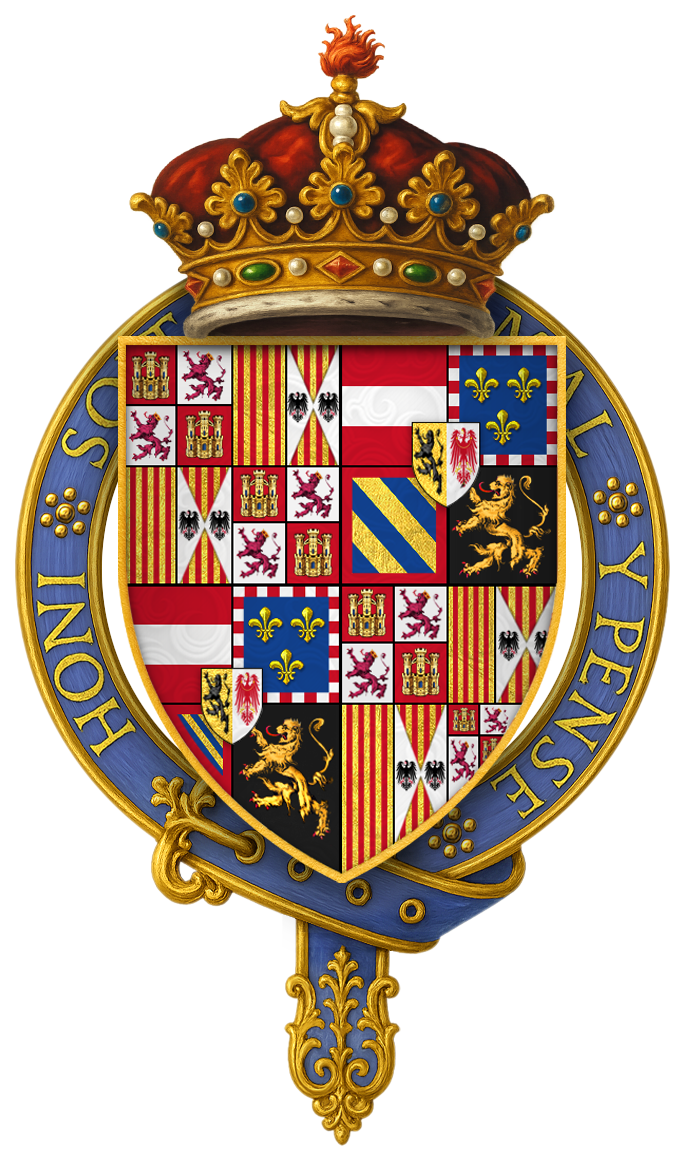
Arms of Charles, Infante of Spain, Archduke of Austria, Duke of Burgundy, KG at the time of his installation as a knight of the Most Noble Order of the Garter

Variant of the Royal Bend of Castile used by Charles V, Holy Roman Emperor

== Historiography, commemoration, and popular culture ==
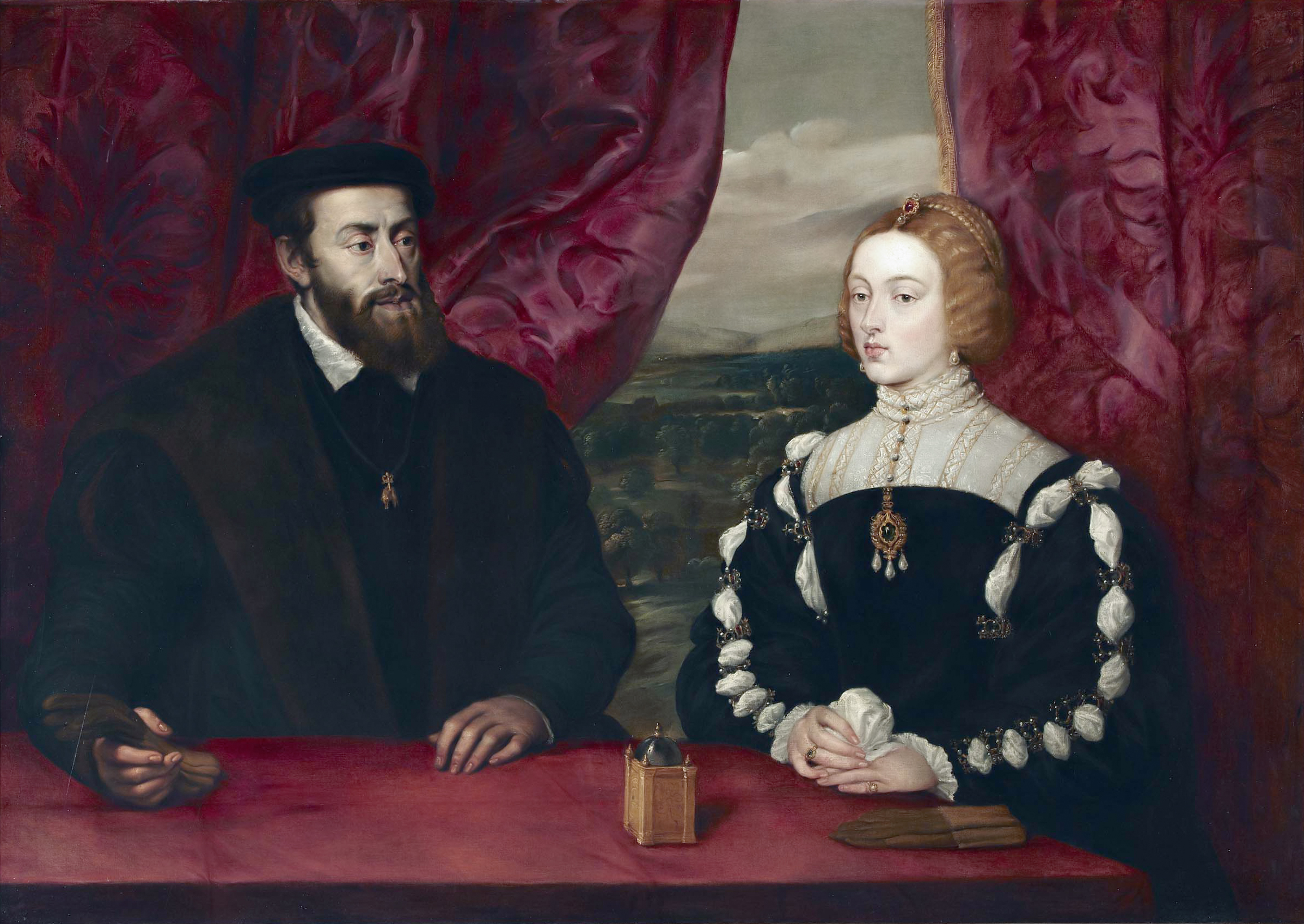
Emperor Charles V and Empress Isabella. Peter Paul Rubens after Titian, 17th century.

Charles V has traditionally attracted considerable scholarly attention. There are differences among historians regarding his character, his rule and achievements (or failures) in the countries in his personal empire, as well as various social movements and wider problems associated with his reign. Historically seen as a great ruler by some or a tragic failure of a politician by others, he is generally seen by modern historians as both a capable politician and a brave and effective military leader, although his political vision and financial management tend to be questioned. References to Charles in popular culture include a large number of legends and folk tales; literary renderings of historical events connected to his life and romantic adventures, his relationship to Flanders, and his abdication; and products marketed in his name.

Charles V, as a ruler, has been commemorated over time in many parts of Europe. An imperial resolution of Franz Joseph I of Austria, dated 28 February 1863, included Charles V in the list of the "most famous Austrian rulers and generals worthy of everlasting emulation", and honoured him with a life-size statue, made by the Bohemian sculptor Emanuel Max, located at the Museum of Military History, Vienna. The 400th anniversary of his death, celebrated in 1958 in Francoist Spain, brought together the local National Catholic intelligentsia and a number of European (Catholic) conservative figures, underpinning an imperial nostalgia for Charles V's Europe and the Universitas Christiana, also propelling a peculiar brand of europeanism. In 2000, celebrations for the 500th anniversary of Charles's birth took place in Belgium.

=== Public monuments ===
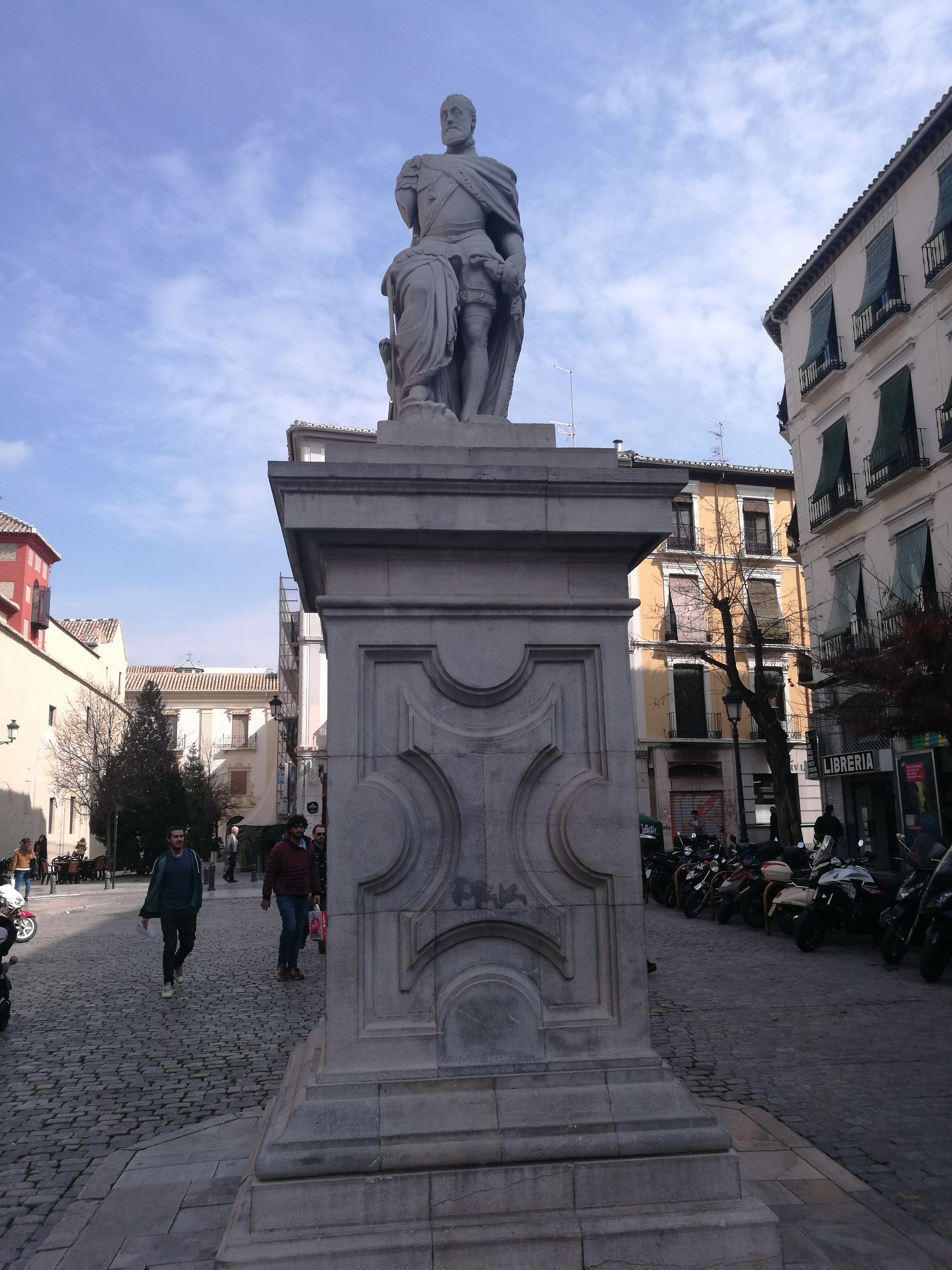
A statue of Charles V in Granada, Spain

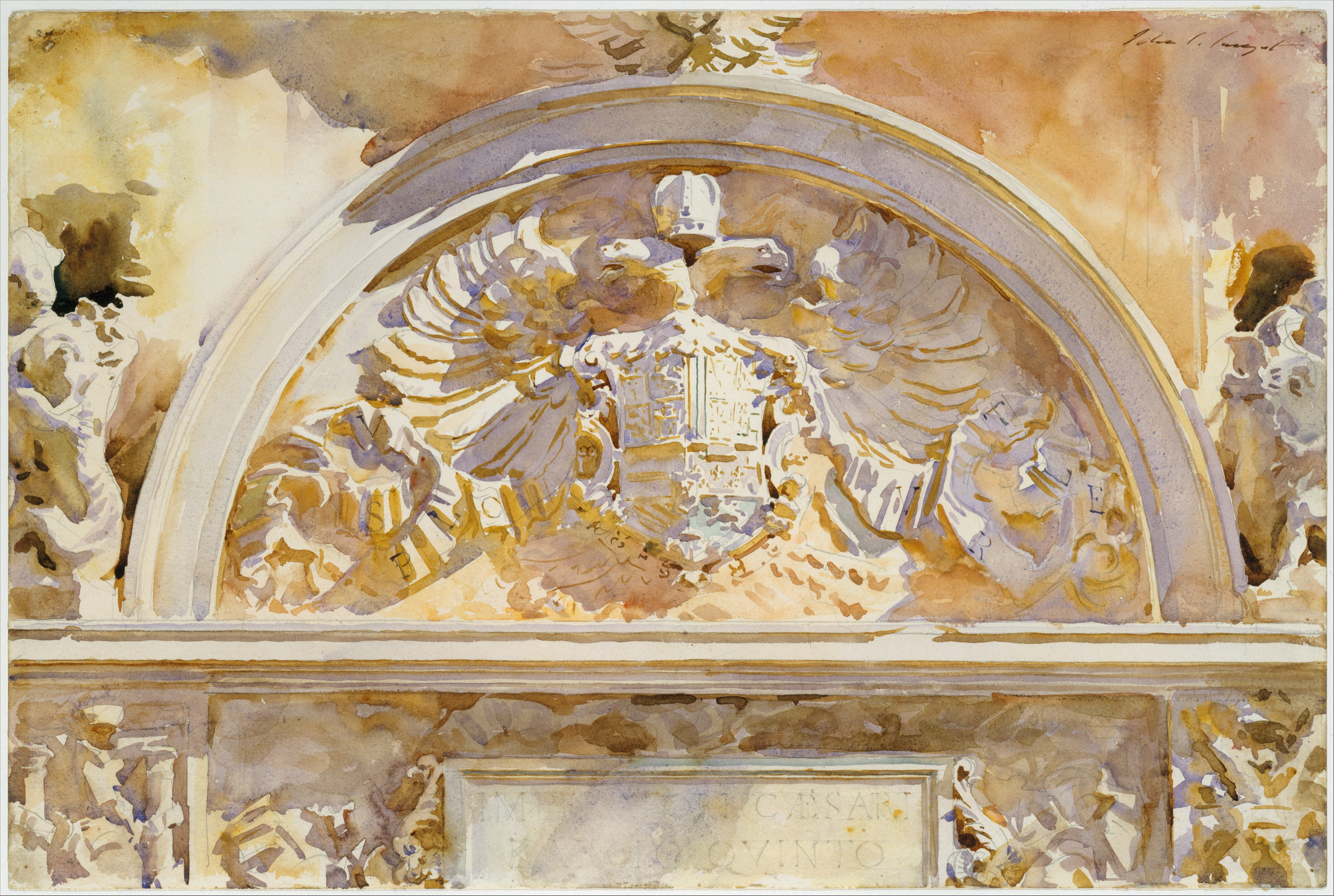
Escutcheon of Charles V, a 1912 watercolour portrait John Singer Sargent, now housed at the Metropolitan Museum of Art in New York City

Unusually among major European monarchs, Charles V discouraged monumental depictions of himself during his lifetime.

- The Charles V Monument in Palermo was erected in 1631 and depicts him triumphant following the Conquest of Tunis.
- Among other posthumous depictions, there are statues of Charles on the façade of the Ghent City Hall and the Royal Palace of Caserta.
- A statue of Charles, donated by the city of Toledo, was erected in 1966 in the Prinsenhof in Ghent where he was born.
- The Plaza del Emperador Carlos V is a square in the city of Madrid that is named after Charles V.
- A bust of Charles V is located at the Walhalla (memorial) in Germany.

=== Literature ===
- In De heerelycke ende vrolycke daeden van Keyser Carel den V, published by Joan de Grieck in 1674, the short stories, anecdotes, citations attributed to the emperor, and legends about his encounters with famous and ordinary people, depict a noble Christian monarch with a perfect cosmopolitan personality and a strong sense of humour. Conversely, in Charles De Coster's masterpiece Thyl Ulenspiegel (1867), after his death, Charles V is consigned to Hell as punishment for the acts of the Inquisition under his rule, his punishment being that he would feel the pain of anyone tortured by the Inquisition. De Coster's book also mentions the story of the spectacles in the coat of arms of Oudenaarde, the one about a paysant of Berchem in Het geuzenboek (1979) by Louis Paul Boon, while Abraham Hans (1882–1939) included both tales in De liefdesavonturen van keizer Karel in Vlaanderen;
- Lord Byron's Ode to Napoleon Buonaparte refers to Charles as "The Spaniard";
- Charles V is a notable character in Simone de Beauvoir's All Men Are Mortal.
- "Cervantes partly modelled the wandering Don Quixote on Charles V."

=== Plays ===
- Charles V appears as a character in the play Doctor Faustus by the Elizabethan playwright Christopher Marlowe. In Act 4, Scene 1 of the A Text, Faustus attends Court by the Emperor's request and with the assistance of Mephistopheles, conjures up spirits representing Alexander the Great and his paramour as a demonstration of his magical powers.

=== Opera ===
- Ernst Krenek's opera Karl V (opus 73, 1930) examines the title character's career via flashbacks;
- In the third act of Giuseppe Verdi's opera Ernani, the election of Charles as Holy Roman Emperor is presented. Charles (Don Carlo in the opera) prays before the tomb of Charlemagne. With the announcement that he has been elected as Carlo Quinto, he declares an amnesty, including the eponymous bandit Ernani, who had followed him there to murder him as a rival for the love of Elvira. The opera, based on the Victor Hugo play Hernani, portrays Charles as a callous and cynical adventurer whose character is transformed by the election into a responsible and clement ruler;
- In another Verdi opera, Don Carlo, the final scene implies that it is Charles V, now living the last years of his life as a hermit, who rescues his grandson, Don Carlo, from his father Philip II of Spain and the Inquisition, by taking Carlo with him to his hermitage at the monastery in Yuste.

=== Television and film ===
- Charles V is portrayed by Hans Lefebre and is featured prominently in the 1953 film Martin Luther, covering Luther's years from 1505 to 1530;
- Charles V is portrayed by Torben Liebrecht and is figured prominently in the 2003 film Luther covering the life of Martin Luther up until the Diet of Augsburg;
- Charles V is portrayed by Sebastian Armesto in one episode of the Showtime series The Tudors;
- Charles V is the main subject of the TVE series Carlos, Rey Emperador and is portrayed by Álvaro Cervantes;
- Charles V is portrayed by Sam John in two episodes of the STARZ series The Spanish Princess;
- Charles V is played by Adrien Brody in the movie Emperor; the film has faced several production delays and is not yet released as of 2026.
- Charles V is portrayed by Rupert Everett in The Serpent Queen.

== Male-line family tree ==
House of Habsburg

Original line
Albert; Count of Habsburg c. 1188–1239
Rudolf I of Germany c. 1218–1291
Albert I of Germany; 1255–1308	Hartmann; 1263–1281	Rudolf II; Duke of Austria; 1270–1290
Rudolf I of Bohemia; 1281–1307	Frederick the Fair c. 1289–1330	Leopold I Duke of Austria; 1290–1326	Albert II; Duke of Austria; 1298–1358	Henry the Friendly; 1299–1327	Otto; Duke of Austria; 1301–1339	John; Parricida c. 1290–1312/1313
Albertinian line	Leopoldian line
Rudolf IV; Duke of Austria; 1339–1365	Frederick III; 1347–1362	Albert III; Duke of Austria; 1349–1395	Leopold III; Duke of Austria; 1351–1386	Frederick II; Duke of Austria; 1327–1344	Leopold II; Duke of Austria; 1328–1344
Albert IV; Duke of Austria; 1377–1404	William; Duke of Austria c. 1370–1406	Leopold IV; Duke of Austria; 1371–1411	Ernest; Duke of Austria; 1377–1424	Frederick IV; Duke of Austria; 1382–1439
Albert II of Germany; 1397–1439	Frederick III; HRE; 1415–1493	Albert VI; Archduke of Austria; 1418–1463	Sigismund; Archduke of Austria; 1427–1496
Ladislaus the Posthumous; 1440–1457	Maximilian I HRE; 1459–1519
Philip I of Castile; 1478–1506
Spanish / Iberian line	Austrian / HRE line
Charles V HRE; 1500–1558	Ferdinand I HRE; 1503–1564
Philip II of Spain; 1527–1598	Maximilian II; HRE; 1527–1576	Ferdinand II; Archduke of Austria; 1529–1595	Charles II; Archduke of Austria; 1540–1590
Carlos; Prince of Asturias; 1545–1568	Philip III of Spain; 1578–1621	Rudolf II; HRE; 1552–1612	Ernest of Austria; 1553–1595	Matthias; HRE; 1557–1619	Maximilian III; Archduke of Austria; 1558–1618	Albert VII; Archduke of Austria; 1559–1621	Wenceslaus; Archduke of Austria; 1561–1578	Andrew; Margrave of Burgau; 1558–1600	Charles; Margrave of Burgau; 1560–1618	Ferdinand II; HRE; 1578–1637	Maximilian Ernest of Austria; 1583–1616	Leopold V Archduke of Austria; 1586–1632	Charles of Austria; 1590–1624
Philip IV of Spain; 1605–1665	Charles of Austria; 1607–1632	Ferdinand of Austria; 1609–1641	John-Charles of Austria; 1605–1619	Ferdinand III; HRE; 1608–1657	Leopold Wilhelm of Austria; 1614–1662	Ferdinand Charles; Archduke of Austria; 1628–1662	Sigismund Francis; Archduke of Austria; 1630–1665
Balthasar Charles; Prince of Asturias; 1629–1646	Charles II of Spain; 1661–1700	Ferdinand IV; King of the Romans; 1633–1654	Leopold I HRE; 1640–1705	Charles Joseph of Austria; 1649–1664
Joseph I HRE; 1678–1711	Charles VI; HRE; 1685–1740
Lorraine
Maria Theresa; HRE; 1740–1780	Francis I HRE; 1745–1765
Habsburg-Lorraine
Joseph II; HRE; 1765–1790	Leopold II; HRE; 1790–1792
Francis II; HRE; 1792–1806

== See also ==
- Royal Armoury of Madrid
- Museum of Military History, Vienna

== Bibliography ==
- Boone, Rebecca Ard (2021). "Charles V, Emperor". Oxford Bibliographies Online (obo). Archived from the original on 9 February 2022.
- Enepekides, P. K. (1960). "Das Wiener Testament des Andreas Palaiologos vom 7. April 1502" [The Vienna Testament of Andreas Palaiologos from 7 April 1502]. Akten des 11. Internat. Byzantinisten-Kongresses 1958 (in German). Munich: C. H. Beck. pp. 138–143. OCLC 761003148.
- Ferdinandy, Michael de (2021). Charles V: Holy Roman emperor. Archived from the original on 9 May 2015.
- Fletcher, Catherine (2016). The Black Prince of Florence: The Spectacular Life and Treacherous World of Alessandro de' Medici. Oxford University Press.
- Freiberg, Jack (2014). Bramante's Tempietto, the Roman Renaissance, and the Spanish Crown. New York: Cambridge University Press. ISBN 978-1107042971.
- Setton, Kenneth M. (1978). The Papacy and the Levant (1204–1571), Volume II: The Fifteenth Century. Vol. 2. Philadelphia: The American Philosophical Society. ISBN 0-87169-127-2.
- Parker, Geoffrey (2019). Emperor: A New Life of Charles V. New Haven and London: Yale University Press. ISBN 978-0-300-19652-8.
- Tracy, James D. (2002). Emperor Charles V, Impresario of War: Campaign Strategy, International Finance, and Domestic Politics. Cambridge University Press.

Charles V, Holy Roman Emperor House of Habsburg Born: 24 February 1500 Died: 21 September 1558
Regnal titles
Preceded by Philip I of Castile	Duke of Brabant, Limburg, Lothier and Luxembourg; Margrave of Namur; Count of Artois, Flanders, Hainaut, Holland, and Zeeland; Count Palatine of Burgundy; 1506 – 1555	Succeeded by Philip II of Spain
Preceded by Ferdinand II of Aragon	King of Naples; 1516 – 1554 with Joanna of Castile (1516 – 1554)	Succeeded by Philip II of Spain
Preceded by Ferdinand II of Aragon	King of Aragon, Majorca, Valencia, Sardinia, Sicily; Count of Barcelona, Roussillon and Cerdagne; 1516 – 1556 with Joanna of Castile (1516 – 1555)	Succeeded by Philip II of Spain
Preceded by Ferdinand II of Aragon	King of Upper Navarre; 1516 – 1556 with Joanna of Castile (1516 – 1555)	Succeeded by Philip II of Spain
Preceded by Joanna of Castile and Ferdinand V of Castile	King of Castile and León; 1516 – 1556 with Joanna of Castile (1516 – 1555)	Succeeded by Philip II of Spain
Preceded by William I and V	Duke of Guelders; Count of Zutphen; 1543 – 1555	Succeeded by Philip II of Spain
Preceded by Maximilian I, Holy Roman Emperor	Archduke of Austria; Duke of Styria, Carinthia and Carniola; Count of Tyrol; 1519 – 1521	Succeeded by Ferdinand I, Holy Roman Emperor
Preceded by Maximilian I, Holy Roman Emperor	King of Germany; 1519 – 1556	Succeeded by Ferdinand I, Holy Roman Emperor
Preceded by Maximilian I, Holy Roman Emperor	Holy Roman Emperor; 1530 – 1556	Succeeded by Ferdinand I, Holy Roman Emperor
Preceded by Maximilian I, Holy Roman Emperor	King of Italy; 1530 – 1556	Vacant Title next held by Napoleon I
Preceded by Ferdinand II of Aragon	King of Navarre with Joanna of Castile (1516 – 1530) disputed by Henry II of Navarre (1521 – 1530)	Succeeded by Henry II of Navarre
Spanish royalty
Preceded by Joanna of Castile	Prince of Asturias; 1504 – 1516	Vacant Title next held by Philip II of Spain
Preceded by Joanna of Castile	Prince of Girona; 1516	Vacant Title next held by Philip II of Spain
