= Jean De Bast =

Belgian draughtsman and engraver (1833–1975)

Jean De Bast (14 June 1883 – 24 December 1975) was a Belgian postage stamp draughtsman and engraver.

== Biography ==
Jean De Bast was born in Brussels, Belgium, on 14 June 1883. In 1907, he joined the national postage stamp printinghouse in Mechelen, after having completed his artistic training in drawing, painting, engraving. He finished his career there in 1945 as a senior foreman.

His first works in philately were the series "Helmeted King" in 1919 and the engraving of the effigy of King Albert I ("Houyoux" type) in 1922.

In 1926, the Belgian sovereigns realized his value after the issue of a stamp to benefit the fight against tuberculosis. In accordance with the wish of the King, a competition was organized between four Prix de Rome recipients and De Bast, who won. From then onwards, De Bast was the appointed engraver of the Postal Services.

While keeping his position at the postage stamps printing-house, De Bast worked as a freelance engraver, producing works of high quality.

In 1952, he disagreed with the Postal Service management, which had without his consent retouched the original matrix for a stamp bearing the effigy of King Baudouin. The stamp as issued received negative reviews from the press and was rapidly withdrawn from sale. De Bast waited for several years before being entrusted with another stamp engraving.

He put an end to his career in 1967, at the age of 84. In 1964 and 1965, two of his stamps received a golden medal in Paris: "Infant Christ with John the Baptist and two angels" (after Peter Paul Rubens) and "The daughters of the painter Cornelis de Vos".

Between 1926 and 1967, he engraved more than one hundred postage stamps, ten or twelve stamps for the railway, and five fiscal stamps for the Ministry of Finance. De Bast obtained numerous distinctions both for his work and his behaviour as a patriot during the war. Ten years after his death, on the occasion of the "Journée du timbre" (Stamp Day), the Postal Service paid homage to him by issuing a stamp showing him at work.

== Works ==
All his stamps were printed with the intaglio process, also called copperplate printing. Since 1959, some of them have been printed using combination of intaglio and rotogravure (also called heliography, screen printing or photogravure) processes.

=== Belgian postage stamps ===
- "Antituberculeux" (fight against tuberculosis), 6 December 1926: lion and Cross of Lorraine printed in typography. King Albert I and Queen Elisabeth, each one in a medallion
- "The sites", 2 December 1929: waterfall at Coo, Bayard Rock in Dinant, Menin Gate in Ypres, Orleans's walk in Spa, Antwerp’s port, Green wharf in Bruges
- "Philatelic exhibition in Antwerp", 9 August 1930: the coat of arms of the city
- "Centenary of National Independence, 1 July 1930: Kings Leopold I, Leopold II and Albert I, after paintings by Liévin De Winne and Jef Leempoels

* "The castles", 1 December 1930: castles of Beloeil, Ooidonk, Ghent, Bouillon and Gaasbeek

- "King Albert I wearing a kepi", 15 June 1931
- "Nurse wearing a head-band", 1 December 1931: effigy of Queen Elisabeth
- "Infantry", 4 August 1932: stamp issued for the erection in Brussels of a monument to infantry; after a drawing by the painter Armand Massonet
- "Piccard balloon", 26 November 1932: the stratospheric balloon with which the scientist Auguste Piccard reached a record altitude of 15.785 m (51,775 ft) in 1931
- "Knight", 1 December 1934: crusade against tuberculosis; after a drawing by James Thiriar
- "SITEB", 25 May 1935: Franz von Taxis, first chief postmaster; after a painting by Hans Holbein the Younger
- "City hall of Charleroi", 18 October 1936; after a drawing by Marcel Rau
- "Basilica of Koekelberg", 1 June 1938: the choir of the church
- "The belfries", 1 December 1939: bell towers of Veurne, Namur, Aalst, and Tournai
- "Portraits of the Senate": full-length pictures of personages, decorating the hemicycle of the Senate; most of those paintings made by Louis Gallait. The series was issued in four parts:
  - 15 August 1946: Pippin of Herstal, Charlemagne, Godfrey of Bouillon, Robert of Jerusalem, Baldwin I of Constantinople
  - 25 September 1947: John II, Duke of Brabant, Philip of Alsace, William the Good, Notker of Liège, Philip the Noble
  - 15 December 1948: Isabella of Austria, Albert of Austria
  - 20 December 1949: Philip the Good, Charles Quint, Maria-Christina, Charles of Lorraine, Maria Theresa of Austria
- "Centennial of the first Belgian postage stamp": 1 July 1949: postilion, train and aircraft; after a drawing by Jacques Bruynseraede
- "Belgian-British Union", 15 March 1950: coat of arms of the United Kingdom and Belgium, tank, memorial in Hertain (Tournai); after drawings by Marc Séverin
- "Basilica of Koekelberg", 1 March 1952: consecration of the basilica by Cardinal Van Roey; after a drawing by Marc Séverin
- "King Baudouin", 14 May 1952: first stamp, large size, bearing the effigy of the new King; after a photograph by Robert Marchand
- "13th congress of the U.P.U.", 14 May 1952: congress of the Universal Postal Union, in Brussels. The 12 stamps show the chief postmasters of the Thurn und Taxis family and the castle of Beaulieu; after drawings by William Goffin
- "King Baudouin", 10 December 1952: new effigy, stamps in standard size
- "Edouard Anseele", 27 October 1956, centennial of the birth of this Minister of State
- "Journée du timbre (Stamp Day)", 15 March 1959 Johann Baptista von Taxis taking an oath of office in front of Charles Quint; after a mural by Jean-Emmanuel Van den Bussche
- "Cultural issue", 4 July 1959. Fourth centennial of the establishment of the first Royal Library in Brussels by Philip II of Spain: Charles the Rash, coat of arms of Philip the Good
- "Pope Adrian VI", 31 August 1959: 5th centennial of the birth of this Pope; after a painting by Jan Van Scorel
- "Legends and Folklore", 5 December 1959: the Blancs-Moussis of Stavelot, the Madonna of Peace; after drawings by Jean Van Noten
- "Journée du timbre (Stamp Day)", 20 March 1960: Alexandrine of Rye, countess of Taxis; after a tapestry
- "The World Year of the Refugee", 7 April 1960: three stamps, showing a child, a man, a woman; after drawings by Jean Van Noten
- "Frère-Orban", 15 October 1960: centennial of the Crédit Communal de Belgique established by the minister of Finance Walthère Frère-Orban: after a medal
- "Art crafts", 5 December 1960: lace
- "Nicolaas Rockox", 20 March 1961: 400th anniversary of the birth of this burgomaster of Antwerp; after a drawing by Anthony van Dyck, adapted by Victor Dolphijn
- "Belgian important people", 22 April 1961: Henri Vieuxtemps and W. De Mol; after a drawing by Peter Colfs
- "Architecture masterpieces", 12 March 1962: the Castle of the Counts in Male, the basilica of Our Lady in Tongeren; after drawings by Marc Séverin
- "Journée du timbre (Stamp Day)", 25 March 1962: 16th century horse postilion; after a drawing by James Thiriar
- "Gerardus Mercator", 14 April 1962: 450th anniversary of the birth of this geographer and cartographer; after an engraving by Frans Hogenberg
- "Concentration camps", 16 September 1962: Allegory after a drawing by Idel Ianchelevici
- "Queens of Belgium", 8 December 1962: Queen Fabiola
- "Journée du timbre (Stamp Day)", 7 April 1963: 1505 mail-coach, after a drawing by Eugène Verboekhoven
- "Centenary of the first International Postage Conference", 7 May 1963: frontage of the General Post Office in Paris
- "Ruben’s works", 7 December 1963: Nicholas, painter's son; Infant Christ with John the Baptist and two angels
- "Famous Belgian important people", 2 March 1964: Andreas Vesalius, anatomist of 16th century
- "Journée du timbre (Stamp Day)", 5 April 1964: postilion of Liège, about 1835; after a drawing by James Thiriar
- "Rogier van der Weyden", 19 September 1964: Deposition
- "Famous works of Belgian painters", 5 December 1964: Charles I’s child, painting by Anthony van Dyck; painter Cornelis De Vos’s daughters, by himself
- "Philately of the Youth", 27 March 1965: Sir Rowland Hill (postal reformer), origin of the basic concepts of the modern postal service
- "Journée du timbre (Stamp Day)", 25 April 1965: horsed postmaster of 19th century; after a drawing by James Thiriar
- "Centenary of King’s Leopold I death", 13 November 1965: effigy after stamps of 1865
- "Journée du timbre (Stamp Day)", 17 April 1966: country postman of 1852; after a watercolor by James Thiriar
- "Professor August Kekulé", 9 July 1966: portrait of the chemist who discovered the ring shape of the benzene molecule
- "Cultural issue", 27 August 1966: site and seal of the town Huy; after a composition by Jean Malvaux
- "Children's games", 3 December 1966: children forming a caterpillar; after a drawing by Francine Somers
- "Journée du timbre (Stamp Day)", 16 April 1967: horse postilion of 1833; after a drawing by Oscar Bonnevalle

Other engraving works related to Belgian postage stamps:

- Overprint assigned to be put on the stamps of the first series "Orval", with regard to the laying of the foundation stone of the abbey by Prince Leopold. This overprint shows the monogram L topped by a crown, and bears the date 19-8-29 (19 August 1929).
- The ornaments figuring on the sheet Koekelberg. The stamp showing the basilica's choir was issued on 1 June 1938. On 21 July, this stamp was republished, in a different colour, on the middle of a sheet bearing:
  - above, an escutcheon held by two angels, showing the basilica's front view
  - below, the words VT PATRIA VOTVM PERSOLVAT

=== Airmail stamps ===
- "Fokker VII airplane flying over varied towns", 30 April 1930: rotogravure; after a drawing by P. Goblet
- "DC 4 Skymaster", 23 February 1946: aircraft linking Brussels and Léopoldville; after a drawing by Marcel Cros
- "Bastogne", 15 June 1946: with extra postage for the benefit of the setting up of a memorial to pay homage to American combatants at Bastogne; after a drawing by S. André

=== Stamps for Railways and postal packets ===
- "Arms of the Kingdom", 1923
- "General Post Office in Brussels", 25 February 1929
- "Centenary of Belgian Railways", June 1935: diesel motor-coach, steam-engine
- "International Railway Congress, in Brussels", 6 July 1939: allegory; after a medal by Godefroid De Vreese
- "Handicrafts", 11 November 1942: digger, engine-driver, fireman
- "Signal", 1 August 1942: electric train and signaling
- "Level crossing", 2 June 1946

=== Stamps for the Belgian Congo ===
- "Airplane flying over a landscape", 22 January 1934: airmail stamps

=== Projects of stamps not carried or unpublished ===
- "Albert I" (1928): this engraving is De Bast's participation to the competition he won against four Prix de Rome engravers
- "Albert I" (1934): project carried but not issued, due to the accidental death of the King; engraving assigned to a typographic printing
- "Protection of black children" (1936): stamp for the Belgian Congo, showing Queen Astrid surrounded with Congolese children; project refused by the Postal Services, who issued 3 stamps very similar, in rotogravure
- "Prince Charles" (1947): portrait of the Regent, who finally refused the issue of stamps bearing his effigy
- "King Baudouin wearing glasses" (1953): project to replace the stamp badly retouched by the Postage Stamps printing-house
