= Prinsenhof, Ghent =

Prinsenhof
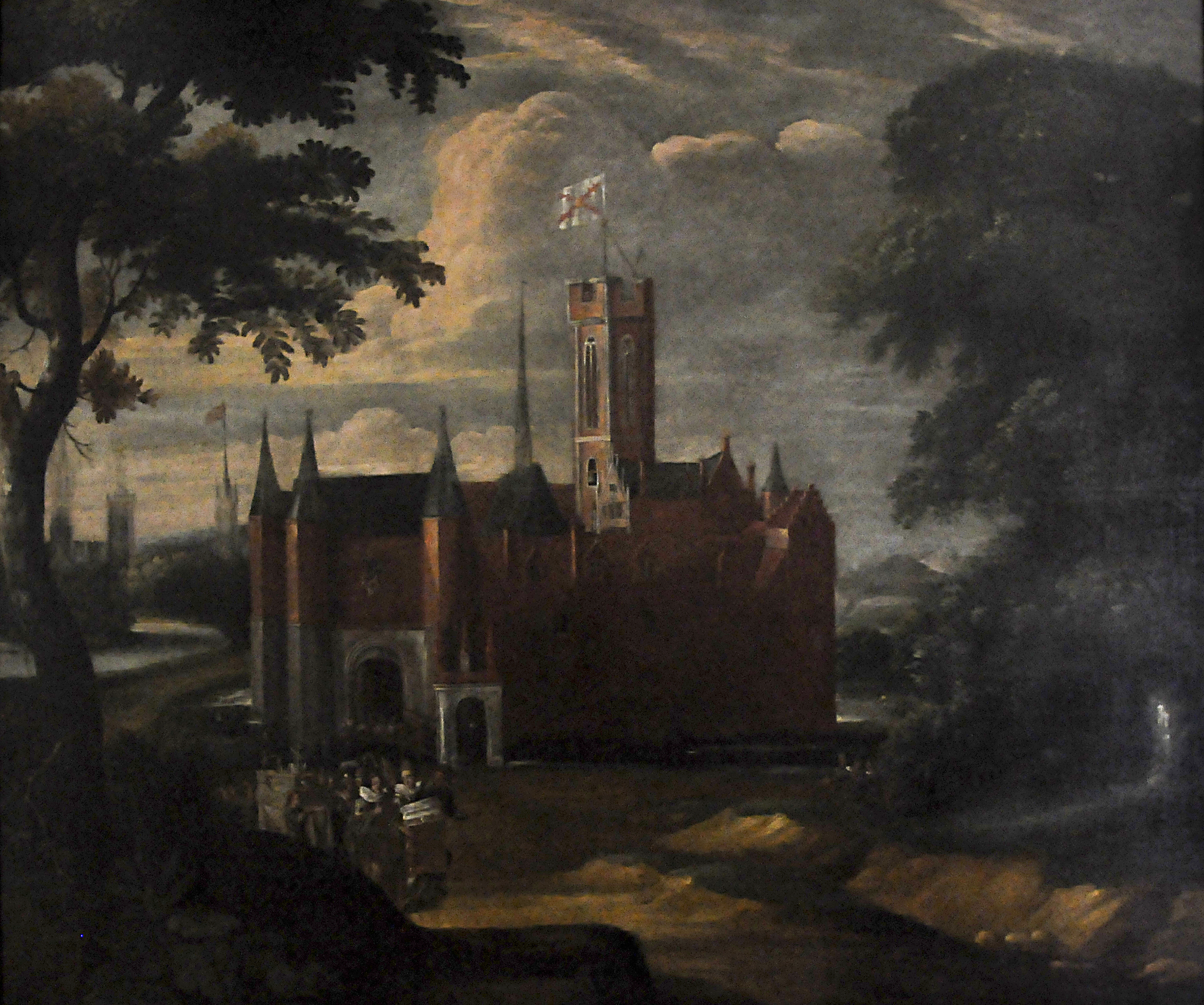
- An anonymous 17th century painting depicting the Prinsenhof in the lifetime of Charles V, Holy Roman Emperor
- Interactive map of the Prinsenhof area

General information
- Coordinates: 51.0592°N 3.71574°E

The Prinsenhof (Dutch; literally "Princes' Court") or Hof ten Walle was a historic building in Ghent, East Flanders in Belgium. It served as the official residence of the Counts of Flanders from the 15th century after the Gravensteen fell into disuse, having previously been the home of the financier Simon de Mirabello. It was completely rebuilt by Louis II, Count of Flanders and became the residence of Philip the Handsome and Joanna of Castile. Charles V, Holy Roman Emperor was born there in 1500, who then used it as his residence in the city, calling the States General of the Netherlands to sit in the castle in 1517 and 1521. Today only the postern gate survives.

== Etymology ==
In the 14th Century, the castle was known was Ten Waele, which is etymologically linked to the word for Wallonia and 'stranger'. It was later known as the Hof ten Walle or 'Court of the region of Walle'. From the 16th Century, the building was increasingly known as the Prinsenhof, which can be translated 'Prince's Court'.

== History ==
The site of the Prinsenhof was first used as a residence by Hugo I, castellan of Ghent. He constructed a summer residence that was surrounded by walls and towers. The building was sold in 1231 to Alexander de la Lune, which led to the alternative name Ser-Sandershof. In 1324, it was acquired by the financier Simon de Mirabello. The site was acquired by Louis II and the main building was rebuilt between 1349 and 1353. Over time, it replaced Gravensteen as the official seat for the Counts of Flanders. It was used as their main residence during the reign of Philip the Handsome and Joanna of Castile, daughter of Isabella I of Castile and, in 1500, Charles V, Holy Roman Emperor was born there. Shortly after the birth, on 5 March 1500, Catherine of Aragon, sister of Joanna of Castile and later wife of Henry VIII, visited.

Between 25 and 31 May 1507, 4 April and 25 May 1508 and 20 May to 21 June 1517, the court hosted Margaret of Austria, Duchess of Savoy. During the last of these, Charles V convened the States General to the court, the emperor giving his first speech to the body on 16 June. They returned between 17 and 25 July 1521, at which there was a ceremonial burning of heretical books. It became a favourite of the Emperor, with major work being carried in 1538 to create new gardens and walkways and, in 1545, Charles V invested heavily in improving the structure with new bridges and stonework. However, it fell out of favour soon after. In 1557, it became the residence of Christina of Lorraine. In 1776, the palace was sold by the government and largely demolished, the remains being reused as residences by the local people. As of 2013, the only remaining part of the complex that remains is the Donkere Poorte ('Dark Gate}') that is situated on Bachtenwalle. This postern gate consists of two towers flanking a vaulted arch.

== Description ==
At its height, Prinsenhof had 300 rooms and six gates. It contained a large number of sub-buildings, including a bakery, a laundry, stables, a jewellery room, a spice room, a cupbearer's residence, wine cellars, kitchens, bath stoves and a chapel. The chapel was dedicated to Saint Vitus. There were separate chambers for the Count and his consort. After the rebuild, the consort had residence in the north wing, with a workshop in a tower, kitchen with a well, a sauce room, a pouring room or eschanconnerie, an oratory, a tapestry and a wardrobe. The Margaret of Austria Tower was a four-storey corner tower built in 1518.

The grounds were extensive. Laid out by Lieven Laephaut, the gardens included twenty rosemary beds. During the 16th Century, Jousting took place, as well as games of handball. The court hosted a menagerie that included lions and other wild animals.

== Gallery ==
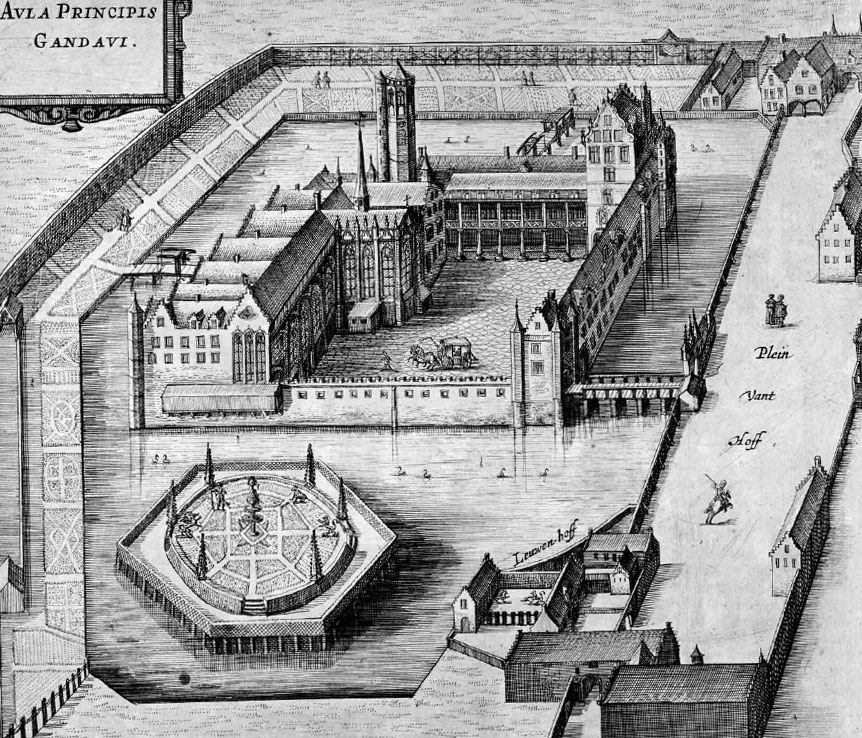
Engraving of the Prinsenhof from Flandria Illustrata (1641)

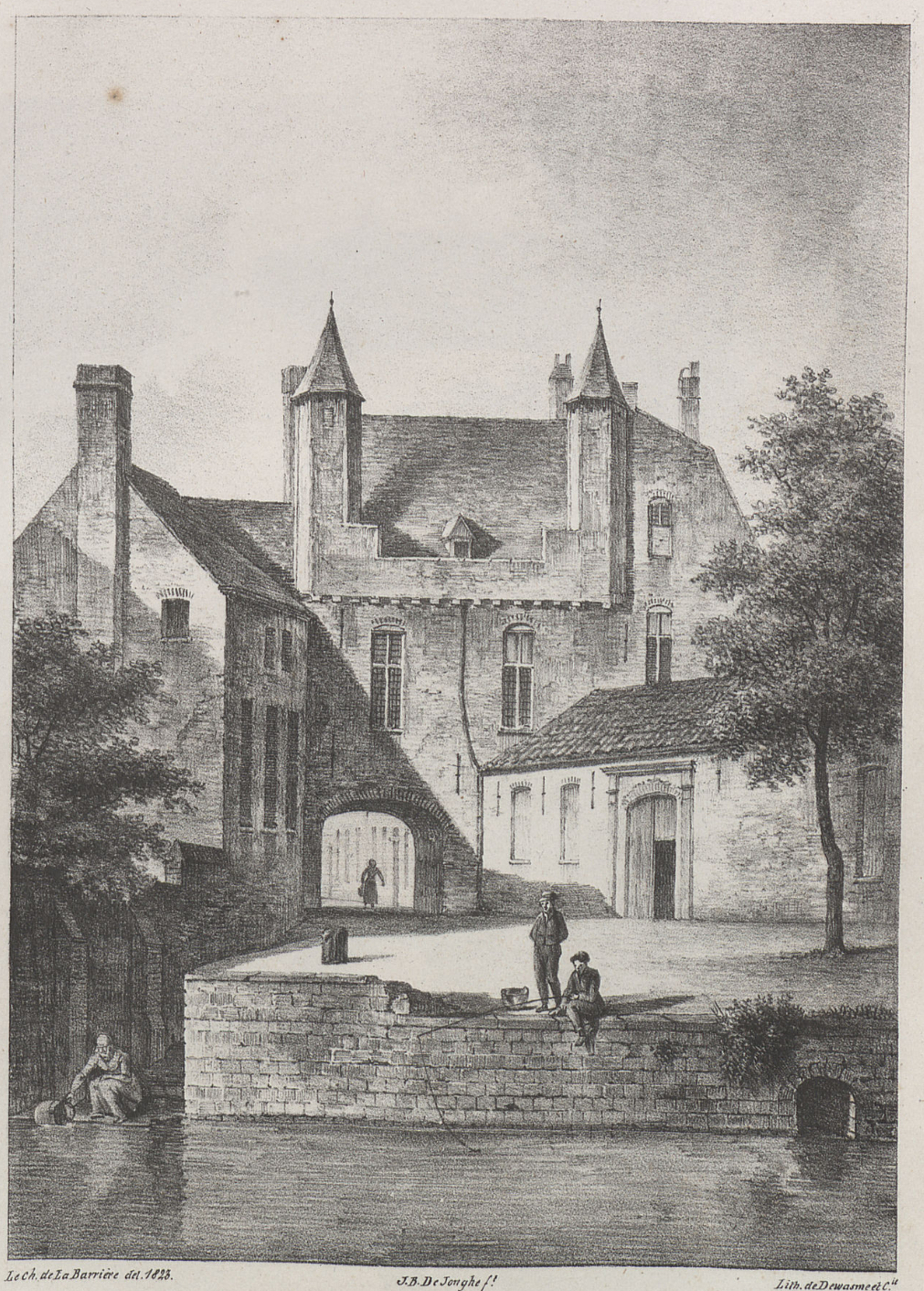
Gateway to the Prinsenhof, depicted in 1823

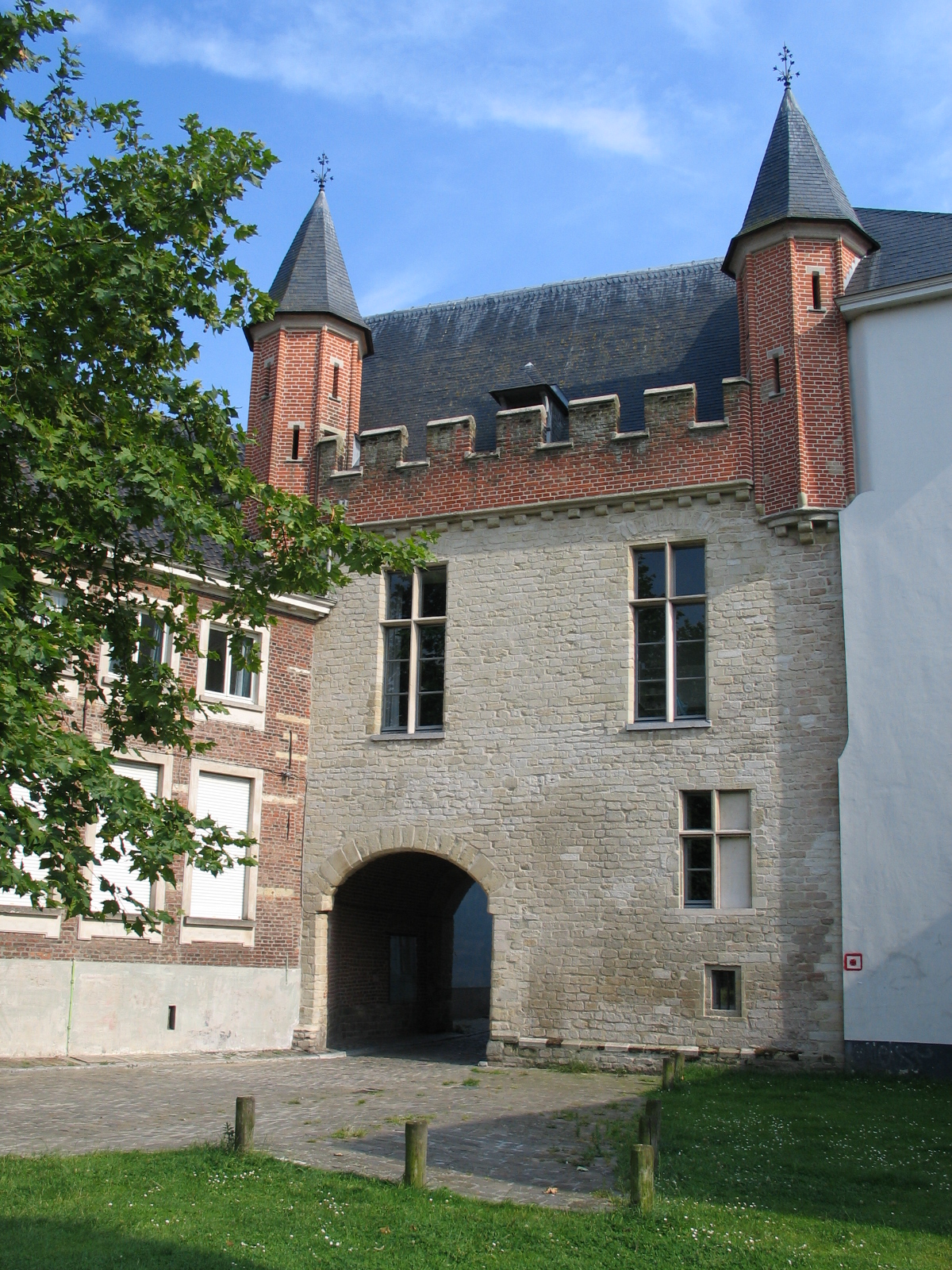
Modern-day view of the entrance gate to the Prinsenhof

== Bibliography ==
- Cauchies, Jean-Marie (2004). Philippe le Beau: le dernier duc de Bourgogne [Philip the Handsome: The last Duke of Burgundy] (in French). Tunrnhout: Brepols. ISBN 978-2-50351-226-6.
- de Keyzer, Laurens; Hendryckx, Michiel (2002). The Count's Castle, Ghent: Tales Behind the Stones. Ghent: Ludion. ISBN 978-9-05544-408-3.
- Hiutse, Brigitte; Cruyt, Evelyn; Van Laecke, Nathalie (2012). Gentse Toeren [Ghent Tours] (in Dutch). Tielt: Lannoo. OCLC 1399512453.
- Lievois, Daniel (2000). "Het Hof ten Walle in gent ten tijde van Keizer Karel V" [The Hof ten Walle in Ghent at the time of Emperor Charles V]. Handelingen der Maatschappij voor Geschiedenis en Oudheidkunde te Gent (in Dutch). 54 (1). doi:10.21825/hmgog.v54i1.365.
- Steyaert, Judocus Johannes (1847). Beknopte beschryving van Gent of verkorte historische beschouwing van die stad en hare bewoners, van die merkwaerdige gebouwen, gestichten en maetschappyen, de bevroemde Gentenaeren, enz. voorgegaen van de beginselen der geschiedenis van Gent [Brief description of Ghent or abbreviated historical review of that city and its inhabitants, of those remarkable buildings, institutions and societies, the famous Ghent residents, etc. based on the principles of the history of Ghent] (in Dutch). Ghent: Snoek-Ducaju en Zoon. OCLC 1070325854.
- Von Barghahn, Barbara (2013). Jan Van Eyck and Portugal's 'Illustrious Generation'. Vol. 1. London: The Pindar Press. ISBN 9781915837042.

== See also ==
- Gravensteen
