= List of protected heritage sites in Stavelot =

This table shows an overview of the protected heritage sites in the Walloon town Stavelot. This list is part of Belgium's national heritage.

| Object | Year/architect | Town/section | Address | Coordinates | Number^{?} | Image |
|---|---|---|---|---|---|---|
| Monumental fountain ^{(nl)} ^{(fr)} | | Stavelot | place Saint Remacle | 50.394844°N 5.929925°E | 63073-CLT-0001-01 Info | Monumentale fontein |
| Meanders of the Amblève ^{(nl)} ^{(fr)} | | Stavelot | | 50.393436°N 5.948378°E | 63073-CLT-0002-01 Info | |
| Abbey: main building of the seventeenth century with the portal building of its museum wing, Arvo or monumental gate, 1714 wing, the church with the big tower (17th century) overlooking the plot, the 16th century church tower, corner building (museum), 17th-century wing, east wing of the Hospice and the old cellars, south wing of the abbey or great dining hall ^{(nl)} ^{(fr)} | | Stavelot | | 50.393435°N 5.931952°E | 63073-CLT-0003-01 Info | Abdij: hoofdgebouw, het gebouw van de zeventiende eeuw, met voorgebouw van de museumvleugel van de 17e eeuw, Arvo of monumentale sluippoort, vleugel van 1714, de kerktoren met de grote toren (17e eeuw) met uitzicht op het perceel, groot kerktoren van de 16e eeuw, hoekpand (museum), vleugel van de 17e-eeuws, oostelijke vleugel van het Hospice en de oude kelders, zuidelijke vleugel van de abdij of grote eetkamer |
| All remains of the abbey of Stavelot and establishment of heritage protection ^{(nl)} ^{(fr)} | | Stavelot | | 50.393943°N 5.931355°E | 63073-CLT-0004-01 Info | Alle overblijfselen van de abdijkerk van Stavelot en oprichting van een beschermingszone |
| Chapel Sainte-Lucie ^{(nl)} ^{(fr)} | | Stavelot | | 50.389677°N 5.914181°E | 63073-CLT-0006-01 Info | |
| House called "Maison Briska": facades and roofs ^{(nl)} ^{(fr)} | | Stavelot | rue des Ecoles, n° 13 | 50.396123°N 5.929852°E | 63073-CLT-0007-01 Info | Huis genaamd "Maison Briska": gevels en daken |
| Organ of the church of Saint-Sebastien ^{(nl)} ^{(fr)} | | Stavelot | | 50.394294°N 5.929087°E | 63073-CLT-0009-01 Info | Orgels van de kerk Saint-Sébastien |
| Ensemble of the place St-Remacle, facades and roofs of buildings that border it ^{(nl)} ^{(fr)} | | Stavelot | | 50.394687°N 5.930594°E | 63073-CLT-0010-01 Info | Ensemble van de place St-Remacle, de gevels en daken van de gebouwen die er aan grenzen |
| Chapel of Saint-Laurent ^{(nl)} ^{(fr)} | | Stavelot | | 50.391850°N 5.932876°E | 63073-CLT-0011-01 Info | |
| House ^{(nl)} ^{(fr)} | | Stavelot | Rue Haute n° 16 | 50.395658°N 5.930859°E | 63073-CLT-0012-01 Info | Huis |
| House ^{(nl)} ^{(fr)} | | Stavelot | Rue de Spa n° 6, tegenwoordig rue Devant les Capucins n° 6 | 50.395506°N 5.931454°E | 63073-CLT-0013-01 Info | Huis |
| House ^{(nl)} ^{(fr)} | | Stavelot | rue de Spa n°4, tegenwoordig rue Devant les Capucins n° 4 | 50.395464°N 5.931455°E | 63073-CLT-0014-01 Info | Huis |
| Home ^{(nl)} ^{(fr)} | | Stavelot | rue de Spa n°1, tegenwoordig rue Devant les Capucins n° 1 | 50.395458°N 5.931292°E | 63073-CLT-0015-01 Info | |
| House: walls and roofs ^{(nl)} ^{(fr)} | | Stavelot | hameau de Challes n° 2 | 50.394032°N 5.948986°E | 63073-CLT-0019-01 Info | |
| House facades and roofs, except the gazebo ^{(nl)} ^{(fr)} | | Stavelot | rue des Ecoles n° 11 | 50.396087°N 5.929706°E | 63073-CLT-0020-01 Info | Huis: gevels en daken, uitgezonderd het tuinhuisje |
| House: walls and roofs ^{(nl)} ^{(fr)} | | Stavelot | Rue Vinâve n° 2 | 50.393886°N 5.929699°E | 63073-CLT-0021-01 Info | Huis: gevels en daken |
| House: walls and roofs ^{(nl)} ^{(fr)} | | Stavelot | Rue Vinâve n° 6 | 50.394010°N 5.929625°E | 63073-CLT-0022-01 Info | Huis: gevels en daken |
| House: walls and roofs ^{(nl)} ^{(fr)} | | Stavelot | Rue Vinâve n° 8 | 50.394055°N 5.929589°E | 63073-CLT-0023-01 Info | |
| Facades and roofs of the building ^{(nl)} ^{(fr)} | | Stavelot | rue Vinâve n° 10-12 | 50.394120°N 5.929607°E | 63073-CLT-0024-01 Info | Gevels en daken van het gebouw |
| The buffet of the organ and three altars of the Institut Saint-Remacle ^{(nl)} ^{(fr)} | | Stavelot | avenue Ferdinand Nicolay n° 27 | 50.395595°N 5.932131°E | 63073-CLT-0025-01 Info | |
| Fountain Nicolay and the ensemble of the fountain and the chapel of Saint Roch ^{(nl)} ^{(fr)} | | Stavelot | rue Neuve | 50.392499°N 5.926295°E | 63073-CLT-0026-01 Info | Fontein Nicolay en het ensemble van de fontein en de kapel Saint Roch |
| House: walls and roofs ^{(nl)} ^{(fr)} | | Stavelot | rue du Vinâve n° 4 | 50.393936°N 5.929639°E | 63073-CLT-0027-01 Info | Huis: gevels en daken |
| Building: walls and roofs ^{(nl)} ^{(fr)} | | Stavelot | rue Haute n° 18 | 50.395692°N 5.931040°E | 63073-CLT-0029-01 Info | Gebouw: gevels en daken |
| Building: walls and roofs ^{(nl)} ^{(fr)} | | Stavelot | rue Haute n° 14 | 50.395653°N 5.930773°E | 63073-CLT-0030-01 Info | Gebouw: gevels en daken |
| Building: walls and roofs, except the outhouse ^{(nl)} ^{(fr)} | | Stavelot | rue Haute n° 23 | 50.395802°N 5.930986°E | 63073-CLT-0031-01 Info | Gebouw: gevels en daken, uitgezonderd het bijgebouw |
| Building: walls and roofs ^{(nl)} ^{(fr)} | | Stavelot | rue de Spa n°3, tegenwoordig rue Devant les Capucins n° 3 | 50.395532°N 5.931303°E | 63073-CLT-0032-01 Info | |
| Building: walls and roofs ^{(nl)} ^{(fr)} | | Stavelot | rue Haute, n° 19 | 50.395802°N 5.930914°E | 63073-CLT-0033-01 Info | Gebouw: gevels en daken |
| Fountain in the corner of the streets rue Haute and rue du Bac ^{(nl)} ^{(fr)} | | Stavelot | rue Haute en rue du Bac | 50.395729°N 5.930906°E | 63073-CLT-0034-01 Info | Fontein in de hoek van de straten rue Haute en rue du Bac |
| Building: walls and roofs ^{(nl)} ^{(fr)} | | Stavelot | rue Haute, n° 24 | 50.395713°N 5.931269°E | 63073-CLT-0035-01 Info | Gebouw: gevels en daken |
| Building: walls and roofs, except the outhouse to the rear ^{(nl)} ^{(fr)} | | Stavelot | rue Haute, n° 20 | 50.395694°N 5.931099°E | 63073-CLT-0036-01 Info | Gebouw: gevels en daken, uitgezonderd het bijgebouw aan de achterzijde |
| Building: walls and roofs ^{(nl)} ^{(fr)} | | Stavelot | rue Haute, n° 21 | 50.395802°N 5.930946°E | 63073-CLT-0037-01 Info | Gebouw: gevels en daken |
| Tannery, except small construction ^{(nl)} ^{(fr)} | | Stavelot | Rue du Vieux Château n° 1 | 50.391627°N 5.933013°E | 63073-CLT-0038-01 Info | |
| Front, rear and roof of the main building ^{(nl)} ^{(fr)} | | Stavelot | Rue Général Jacques n° 3 | 50.394209°N 5.930264°E | 63073-CLT-0039-01 Info | Voorgevel, achtergevel en daken van het hoofdgebouw |
| Facades and roofs of the building ^{(nl)} ^{(fr)} | | Stavelot | Rue Général Jacques n°1 | 50.394152°N 5.930296°E | 63073-CLT-0040-01 Info | Gevels en daken van het gebouw |
| Fountain on the corner of rue de la Fontaine and rue Général Jacques ^{(nl)} ^{(fr)} | | Stavelot | | 50.394477°N 5.930120°E | 63073-CLT-0041-01 Info | Fontein op de hoek van de rue de la Fontaine en rue Général Jacques |
| Building: walls and roofs, including the construction ^{(nl)} ^{(fr)} | | Stavelot | rue Haute n° 17 | 50.395782°N 5.930847°E | 63073-CLT-0042-01 Info | Gebouw: gevels en daken, waaronder de aanbouw |
| Fountain ^{(nl)} ^{(fr)} | | Stavelot | rue Bas-Vinâve | 50.394156°N 5.929473°E | 63073-CLT-0043-01 Info | Fontein |
| Exterior north wing of the old Capuchin monastery ^{(nl)} ^{(fr)} | | Stavelot | | 50.395803°N 5.931791°E | 63073-CLT-0045-01 Info | Exterieur noordvleugel van het oude Capucijnerklooster |
| Facade and part of the roof of the building ^{(nl)} ^{(fr)} | | Stavelot | Place Saint-Remacle n° 17 | 50.395275°N 5.929635°E | 63073-CLT-0046-01 Info | Voorgevel en deel van het dak van het gebouw |
| House called "maison Susleau": facades and roofs, cladding, surrounding wall adjacent to ruelle Delbrouck ^{(nl)} ^{(fr)} | | Stavelot | rue Chaumont, n° 1 | 50.395013°N 5.929226°E | 63073-CLT-0047-01 Info | Huis genaamd "maison Susleau": gevels en daken, bekleding, omliggende muur grenzend aan ruelle Delbrouck |
| Building: walls, gables and roof ^{(nl)} ^{(fr)} | | Stavelot | Francheville, n° 11 | 50.366480°N 6.010772°E | 63073-CLT-0049-01 Info | |
| House facades, gables and roofs ^{(nl)} ^{(fr)} | | Stavelot | Ster, n° 12 | 50.392760°N 5.899767°E | 63073-CLT-0050-01 Info | |
| Ensemble of the current "Noir Ru" and its surroundings and setting of conservation ^{(nl)} ^{(fr)} | | Stavelot | | 50.350462°N 5.996383°E | 63073-CLT-0052-01 Info | |
| Ponds of Stavelot and setting of conservation ^{(nl)} ^{(fr)} | | Stavelot | | 50.390147°N 5.928458°E | 63073-CLT-0054-01 Info | |
| Facades, gables, roofs and structural elements (poles, beams, etc) of the interior frame of the house and setting of conservation around it ^{(nl)} ^{(fr)} | | Stavelot | rue de Chaumont n° 3 | 50.395091°N 5.929073°E | 63073-CLT-0055-01 Info | Gevels, puntgevels, daken en structurele elementen (palen, liggers, etc) van het interieurframe van het huis en instelling beschermingszone rondom |
| The rock of Warche and setting protection zone ^{(nl)} ^{(fr)} | | Stavelot | | 50.387717°N 5.984576°E | 63073-CLT-0056-01 Info | De rots van Warche en instelling beschermingszone |
| Building: walls and roofs ^{(nl)} ^{(fr)} | | Stavelot | rue de Spa n°8, tegenwoordig rue Devant les Capucins n° 8 | 50.395589°N 5.931442°E | 63073-CLT-0057-01 Info | Gebouw: gevels en daken |
| Facades and roofs of house "Chaumont", as well as certain parts of the interior, on the ground floor the dining room and lobby, including the staircase, and on the first floor the large lounge and fireplace in the office, and the stucco the mantle of the chimney of the bathroom. ^{(nl)} ^{(fr)} | | Stavelot | rue Chaumont n°5, Stavelot | 50.39515°N 5.92894°E | 63073-CLT-0058-01 Info | Gevels en daken van huis "Chaumont", evenals bepaalde delen van het interieur, op de begane grond de eetkamer en de lobby, waaronder het trappenhuis, en op de eerste verdieping de grote salon en de open haard in het kantoor, evenals het stucwerk van de mantel van de schoorsteen van de badkamer. |
| Historical and archaeological site of the old abbey church ^{(nl)} ^{(fr)} | | Stavelot | | 50.393435°N 5.931952°E | 63073-PEX-0001-01 Info | |
| Historical site of the old abbey church ^{(nl)} ^{(fr)} | | Stavelot | | 50.393943°N 5.931355°E | 63073-PEX-0002-01 Info | |

== See also ==
- List of protected heritage sites in Liège (province)
- Stavelot
