= Stavelot =

City in Liège Province, Wallonia, Belgium

Stavelot Ståvleu (Walloon): Stablo (German)
- Municipality
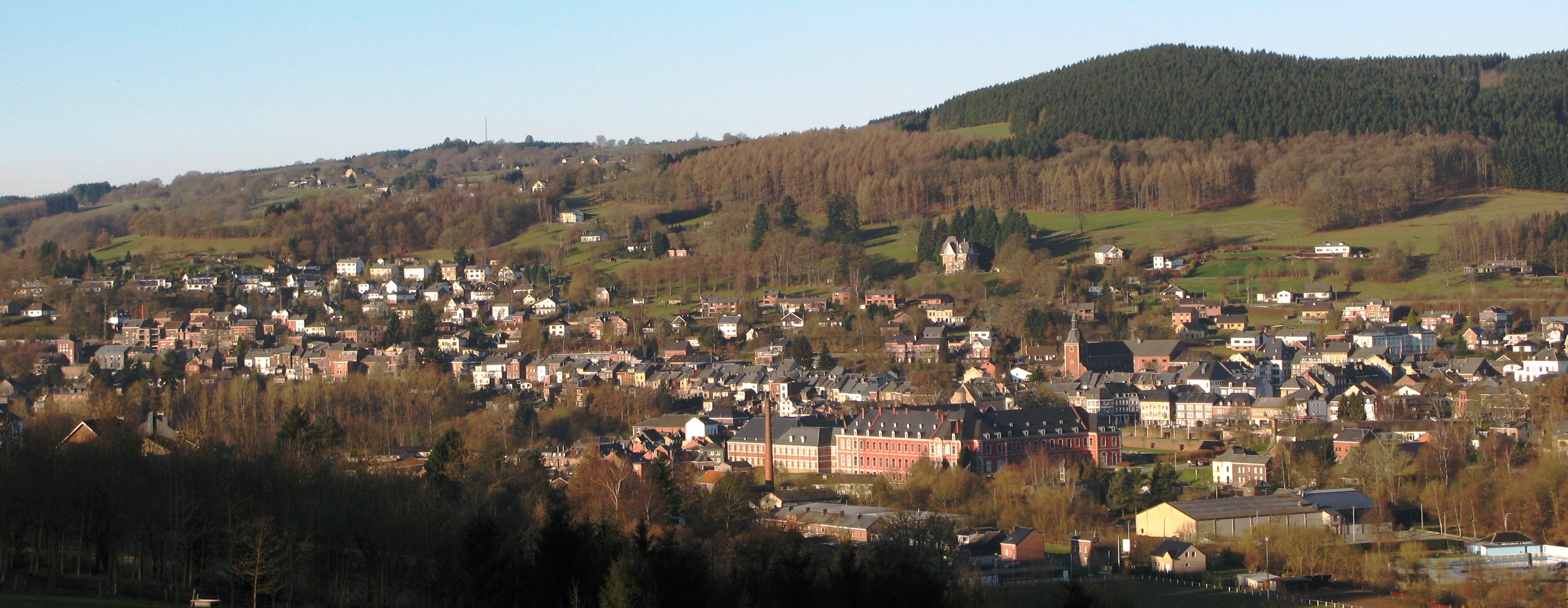

- Flag Coat of arms

- Location of Stavelot in the province of Liège
- Interactive map of Stavelot
- Location in Belgium
- Coordinates: 50°23′N 5°56′E
- Country: Belgium
- Community: French Community
- Region: Wallonia
- Province: Liège
- Arrondissement: Verviers

Government
  - Mayor: Thierry de Bournonville (MR)
  - Governing party: Liste du Bourgmestre

Area
  - Total: 85.14 km^{2} (32.87 sq mi)

Population (2018-01-01)
  - Total: 7,145
  - Density: 83.92/km^{2} (217.4/sq mi)
- Postal codes: 4970
- NIS code: 63073
- Area codes: 080
- Website: www.stavelot.be

Stavelot (French pronunciation: [stavlo]; German: Stablo [ˈʃtablo]; Walloon: Ståvleu) is a city and municipality of Wallonia located in the province of Liège, Belgium.

The municipality consists of the following districts: Francorchamps and Stavelot.

It is best known as the home of Spa-Francorchamps Circuit and the Laetare de Stavelot carnival.

== Population ==
In 2006, Stavelot had a population of 6,671 and an area of 85.07 km^{2} (32.85 sq mi), giving a population density of 78 inhabitants per square kilometre (200/sq mi).

== History ==
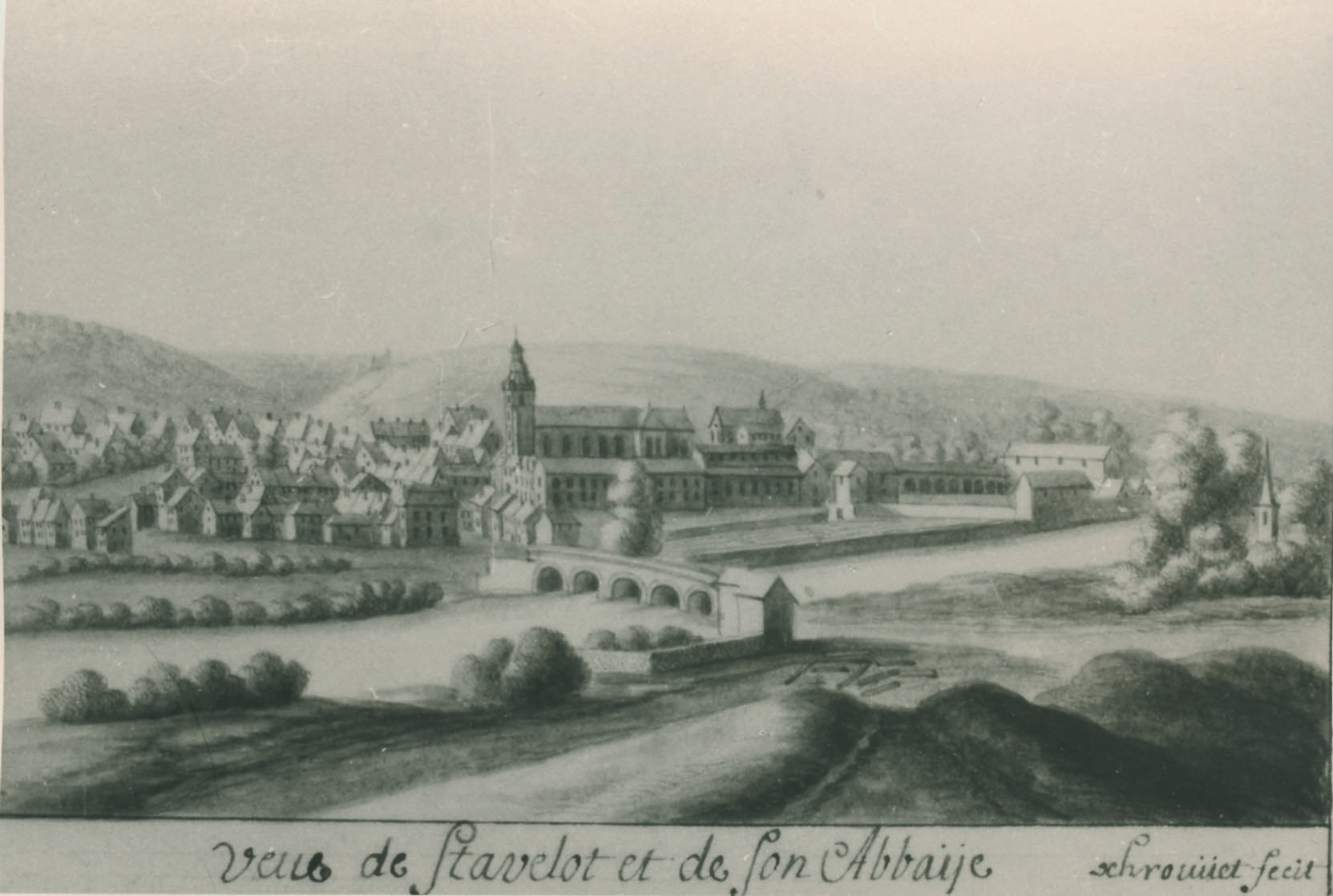
The town and abbey of Stavelot, c. 1735

The town grew up around the Abbey of Stavelot, founded ca 650, out of what had been a villa, by Saint Remaclus (Saint Remacle). The villa's lands occupied the borderland between the bishoprics of Cologne and Tongeren. The Abbey of Stavelot was secularized and demolished at the time of the French Revolution: of the church just the west end doorway remains, as a free-standing tower. Two cloisters — one secular, one for the monks — survive as the courtyards of the brick-and-stone 17th-century domestic ranges, now housing the Museum of the Principality of Stavelot-Malmedy, and museums devoted to the poet Guillaume Apollinaire, who was a long-term resident, and to the Circuit de Spa-Francorchamps. The foundations of the abbey church are presented as a footprint, with walls and column bases that enable the visitor to visualize the scale of the Romanesque abbey.

Abbot Wibald (ruled 1130–58) was one of the greatest patrons of the arts in the 12th century; the Stavelot Triptych of gilded copper and enamels, which contained two fragments of the True Cross, was produced for the Abbey during his rule (about 1156). The binding of the Stavelot Bible, and the remaining fragments from the retable (altar screen) at Stavelot are also high points of medieval art.

In the 16th century, the monk Jean Delvaux claimed to have seen witches and demonic rituals, as he accused several other church officials of engaging in these rituals.

Stavelot was the seat of the Principality of Stavelot-Malmedy, a small independent region of the Holy Roman Empire, ruled by the abbots of Stavelot. The principality was dissolved in 1795 during the French Revolution. At the Congress of Vienna in 1815, Stavelot was added to the Kingdom of the Netherlands while Malmedy was added to the Prussian Rhineland. In 1830 it became part of Belgium. (Malmedy would also become a part of Belgium, but not until 1919.)

The town's coat of arms, granted in 1819, is parted fesswise between Stavelot's founding bishop, and the wolf which in Stavelot's founding legend carried bricks for the building of the Abbey.

During the Battle of the Bulge in World War II, the city was the scene of severe fighting. From December 18–20, 1944, soldiers belonging to Sixth Panzer Army's Kampfgruppe Peiper armored battle group murdered more than 100 civilians, including women and children, as well as American prisoners of war, in Stavelot and the surrounding area. Peiper and some of his officers were after the war tried and convicted for this war crime along with others perpetrated during the same period.

== Attractions ==
Stavelot is home to the Circuit de Spa-Francorchamps, the famous venue of the Formula One Belgian Grand Prix and the Spa 24 Hours endurance race.

Stavelot also has a traditional carnival, the Laetare des Blancs-Moussis. On Laetare Sunday, the fourth Sunday of Lent, some 200 local men clad in white and masked with long red noses — the Blancs-Moussis — parade through town throwing confetti and beating bystanders with dried pig bladders.

== Climate ==
Stavelot has an oceanic climate influenced by its high elevation and inland position towards a more continental type by Belgian standards. Being located at a lower elevation than neighbouring village Malmedy at the other end of the original layout of the Spa-Francorchamps race track, Stavelot is slightly milder, drier and sunnier than Malmedy year round.

Climate data for Stavelot (1981–2010 normals; sunshine 1984–2013)
Month	Jan	Feb	Mar	Apr	May	Jun	Jul	Aug	Sep	Oct	Nov	Dec	Year
Mean daily maximum °C (°F)	3.4 (38.1)	4.6 (40.3)	8.5 (47.3)	12.5 (54.5)	16.7 (62.1)	19.4 (66.9)	21.7 (71.1)	21.3 (70.3)	17.4 (63.3)	12.9 (55.2)	7.3 (45.1)	4.2 (39.6)	12.6 (54.7)
Daily mean °C (°F)	0.9 (33.6)	1.2 (34.2)	4.4 (39.9)	7.4 (45.3)	11.6 (52.9)	14.4 (57.9)	16.6 (61.9)	16.2 (61.2)	12.9 (55.2)	9.3 (48.7)	4.7 (40.5)	1.7 (35.1)	8.5 (47.3)
Mean daily minimum °C (°F)	−1.8 (28.8)	−2.1 (28.2)	0.4 (32.7)	2.4 (36.3)	6.4 (43.5)	9.4 (48.9)	11.5 (52.7)	10.9 (51.6)	8.1 (46.6)	5.4 (41.7)	2.0 (35.6)	−0.7 (30.7)	4.4 (39.9)
Average precipitation mm (inches)	115.1 (4.53)	97.6 (3.84)	105.0 (4.13)	78.8 (3.10)	89.9 (3.54)	96.5 (3.80)	100.9 (3.97)	95.7 (3.77)	97.0 (3.82)	97.3 (3.83)	103.3 (4.07)	120.0 (4.72)	1,197.1 (47.13)
Average precipitation days	15.1	13.1	15.1	11.8	12.5	12.6	12.5	11.7	12.1	12.5	14.9	15.9	159.8
Mean monthly sunshine hours	45	69	113	159	185	181	197	188	133	102	49	34	1,453
Source: Royal Meteorological Institute

== Image gallery ==
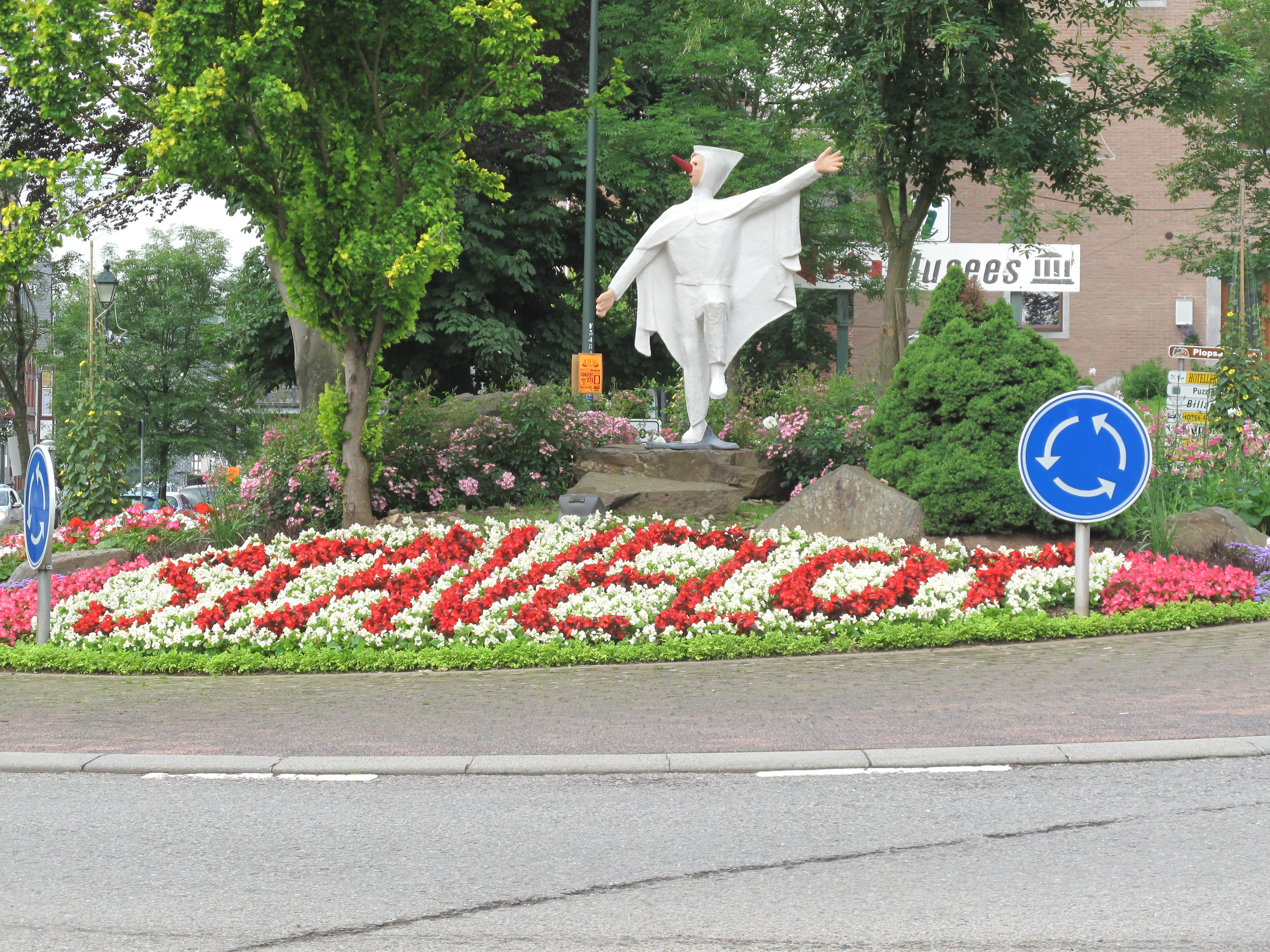
Stavelot in flowers

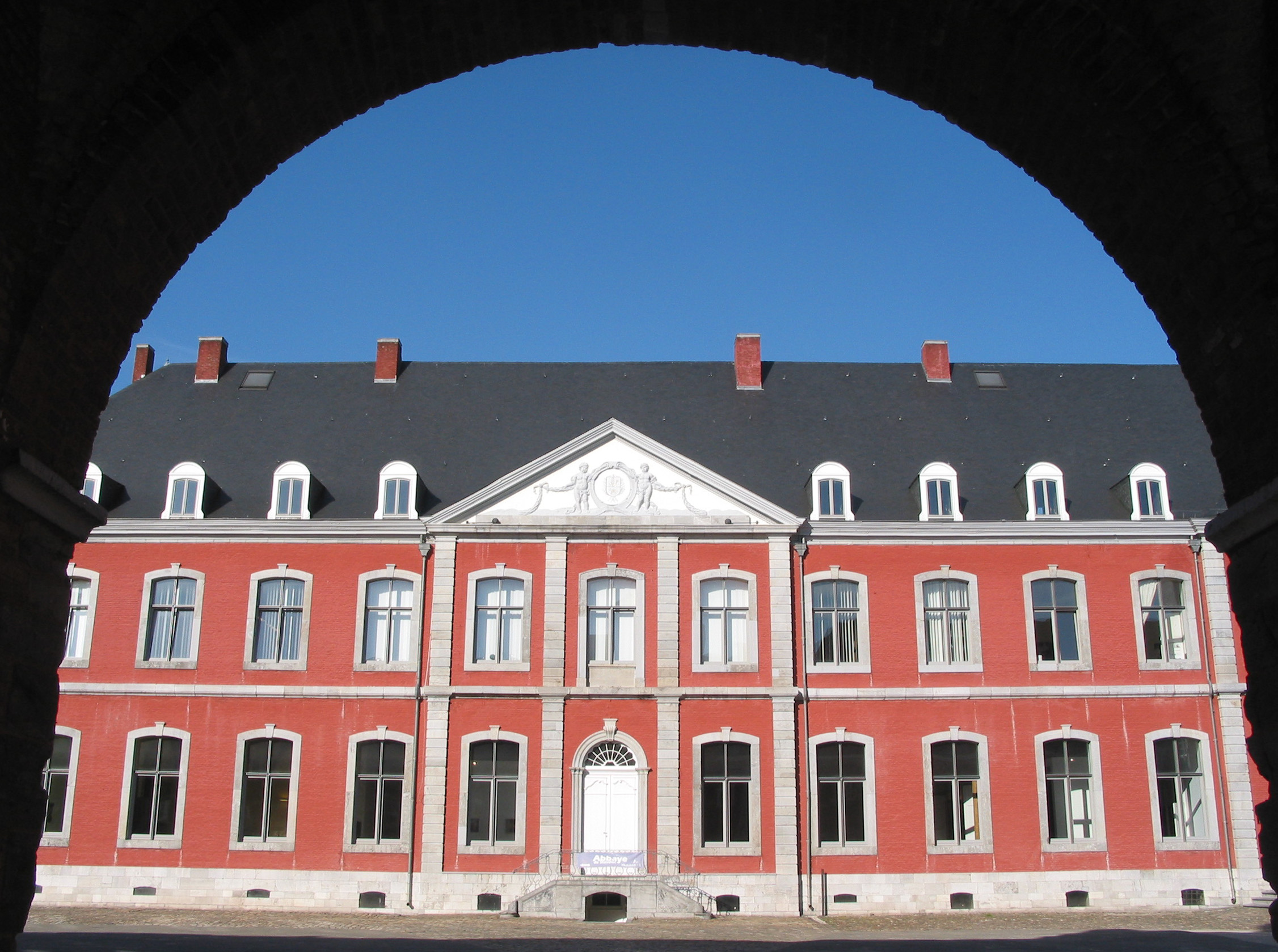
Stavelot Abbey, Belgium (formerly St. Remacle abbey)

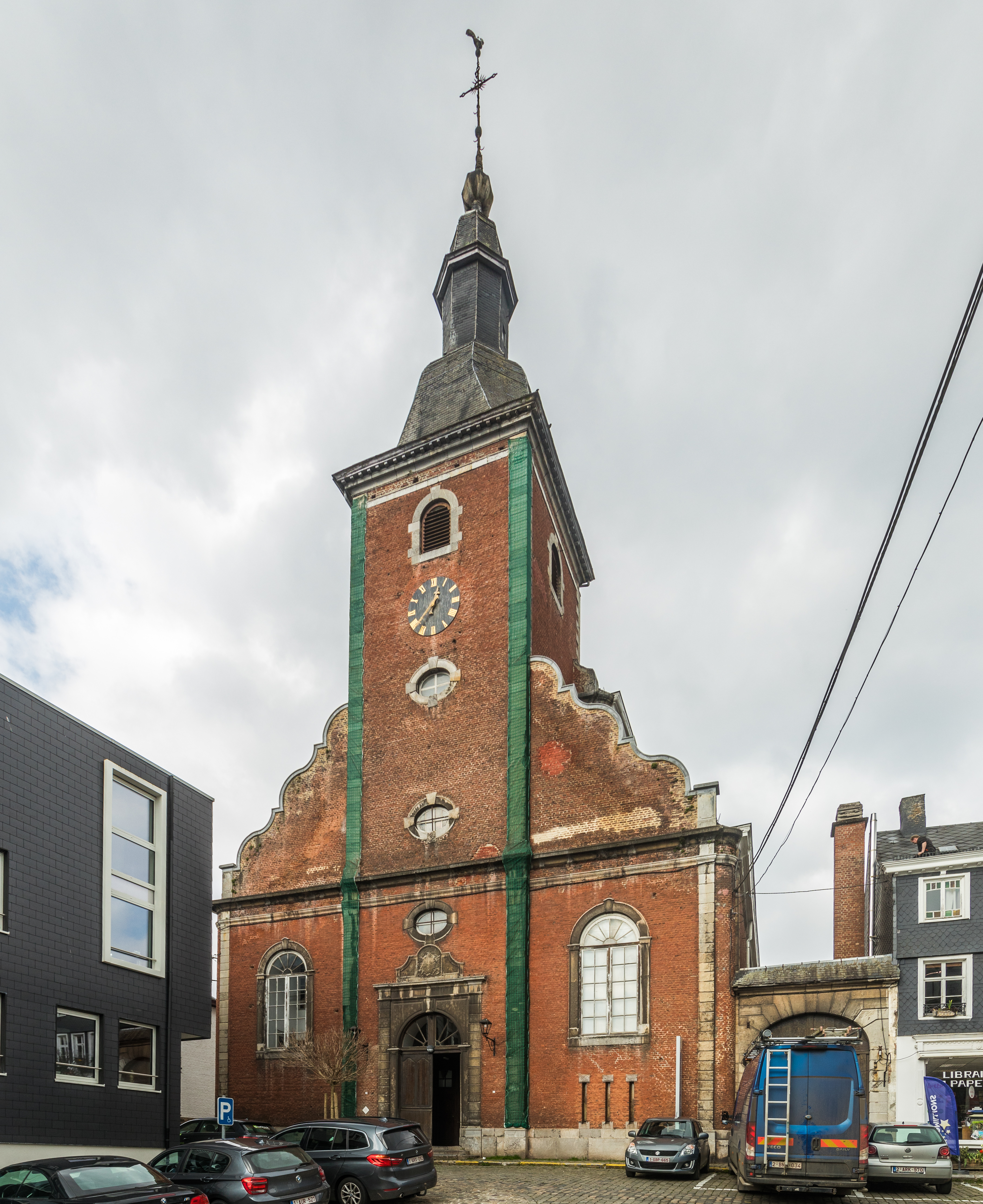
Church of St. Sebastian

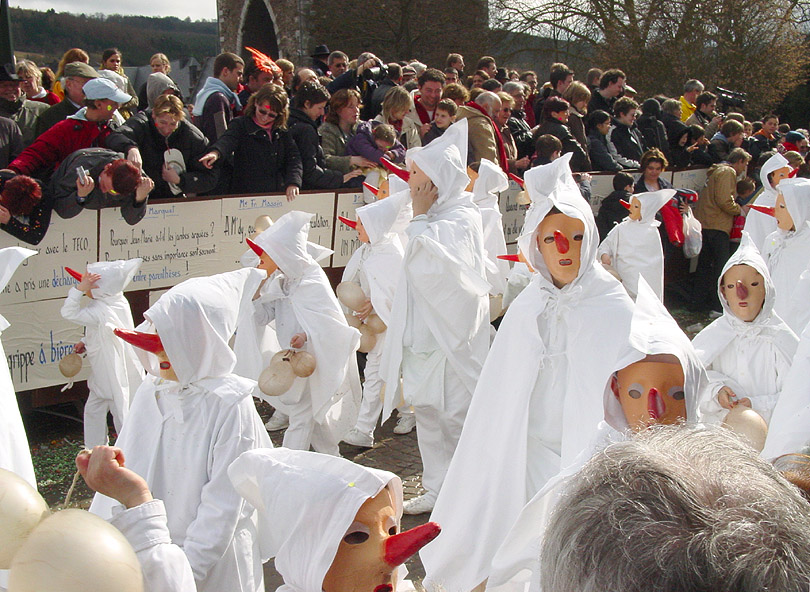
The Blancs-Moussis in the 2006 Carnaval de la Laetare

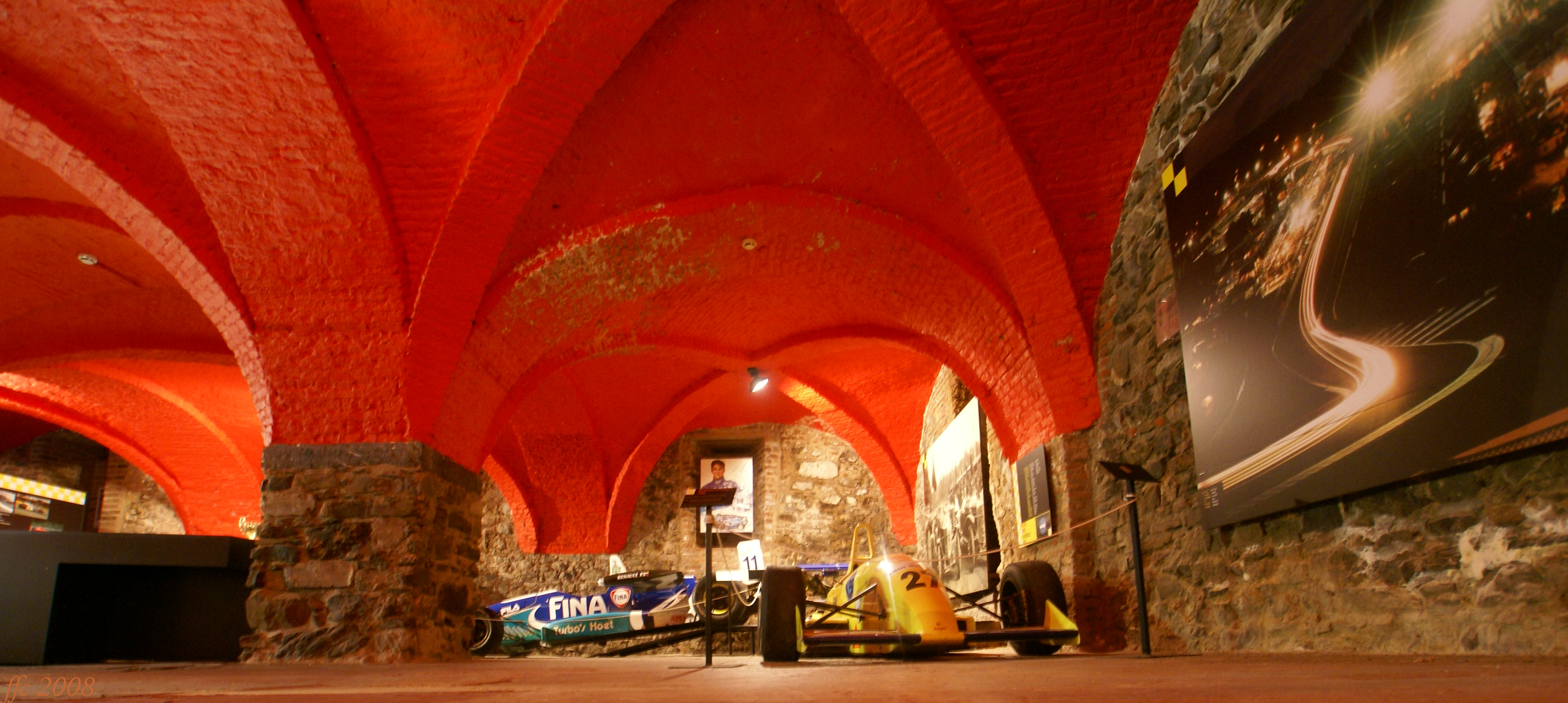
Museum of the Spa-Francorchamps racing circuit

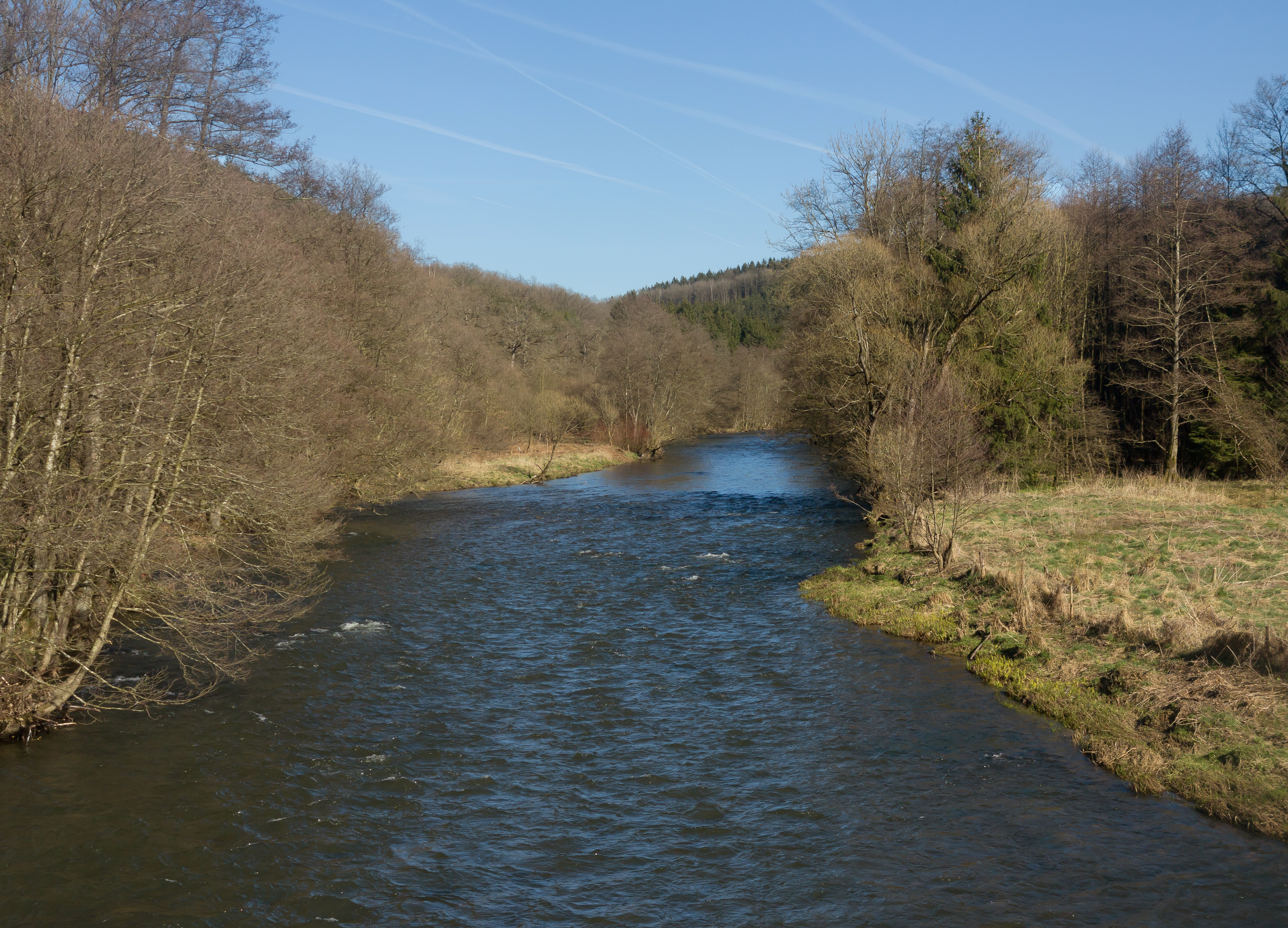
L'Ambléve between Stavelot and Trois Ponts

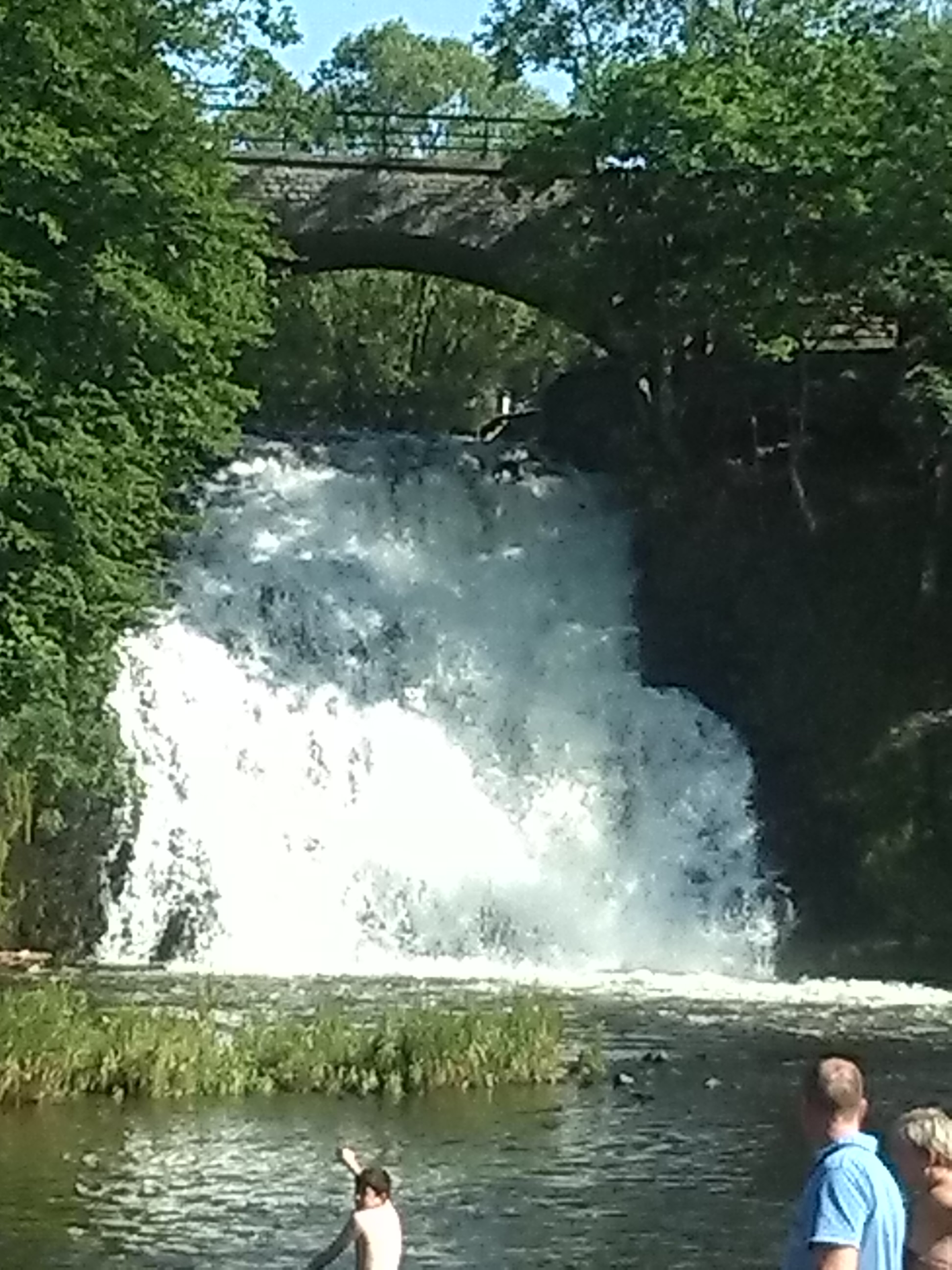
Waterfalls of Coo

== See also ==
- List of protected heritage sites in Stavelot
- The works of Maxime Real del Sarte
