= Laetare de Stavelot =

Lenten carnival in Stavelot, Belgium

Laetare of Stavelot Laetare de Stavelot
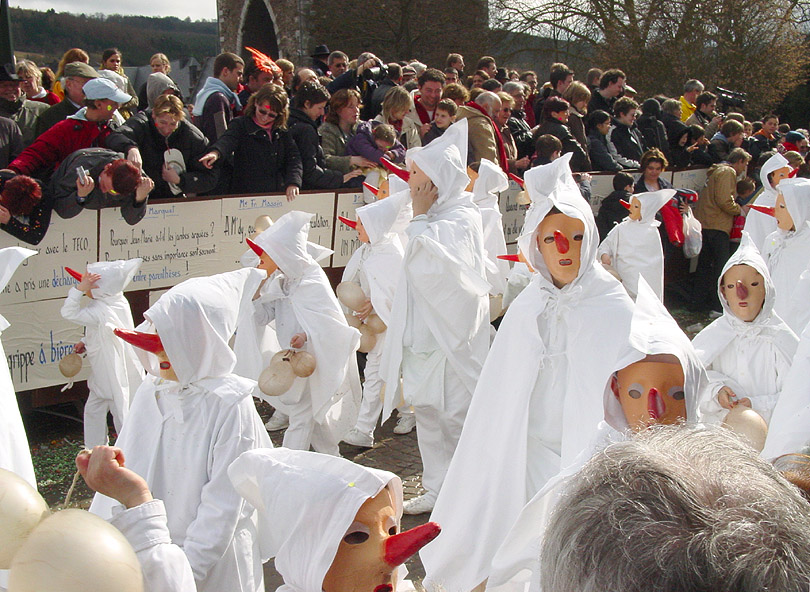
- Procession of the "Blancs Moussis"
- Status: Active
- Genre: Carnival
- Frequency: Annual
- Location: Stavelot
- Country: Belgium

The Laetare of Stavelot (French: Laetare de Stavelot) is a traditional carnival that occurs every Laetare Sunday (fourth Sunday of Lent) in Stavelot, Liège Province, Belgium. This tradition, in Belgium's Wallonia region, is also known for its principal attraction: the "Blancs Moussis".

== History ==
For several centuries the city of Stavelot was the capital of the Princely Abbey of Stavelot-Malmedy, an ecclesiastical principality of the Holy Roman Empire, which was ruled by a prince-abbot. An early prince-abbot is said to have forbidden his clerics from taking part in the popular festivities. According to popular legend, the inhabitants of Stavelot, who enjoyed the participation of monks in the festivities, decided to make fun of this prohibition by dressing up as monks to celebrate carnival until this too was prohibited. Then, in 1502, they created a white costume with a hood referring more discreetly to the monastic habit. This costume was finally accepted by Prince-Abbot Wilhelm von Manderscheid-Kail. The Stavelotains added to the costume a strange mask with a very long, red and pointed nose; thus, the Blancs Moussis (in English: White Clad) were born.

As an emblematic group of the Laetare de Stavelot and symbol of Walloon folklore, the Blancs Moussis have so far existed for more than five centuries, but it was not always easy for them. During the French occupation, they could not go out and party, returning stronger after 1820.

In 1947, they created a fraternity with sparkling costumes and the group continued growing. They became dynamic ambassadors of Belgian folklore and are often invited as special guests to the Carnivals of Düsseldorf, Cologne, Compiègne, Saint-Quentin and elsewhere. This contributes to the fame of Stavelot.

== Customs ==
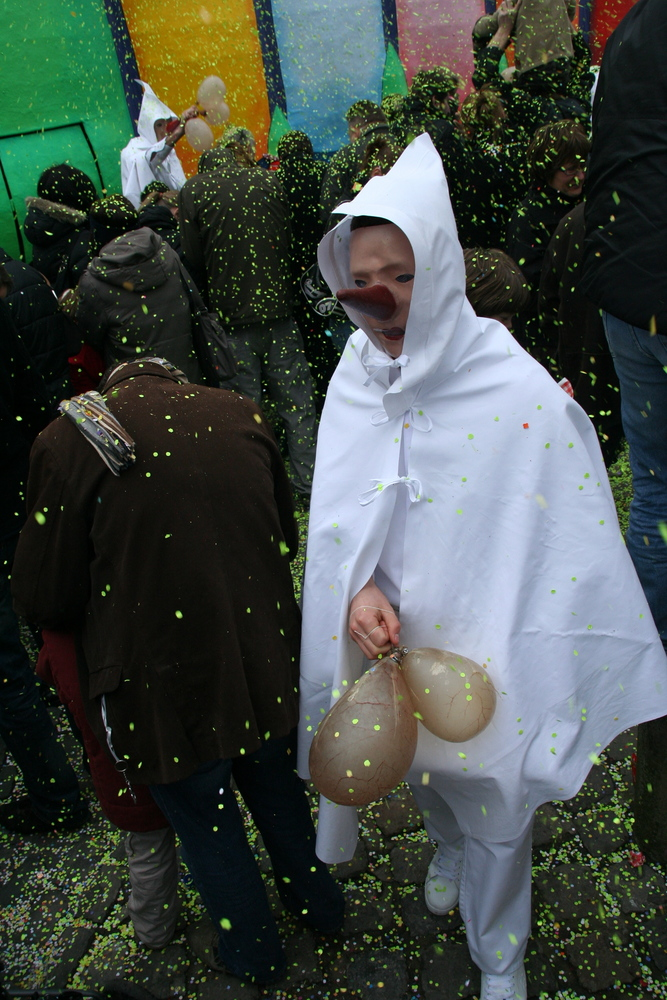
A "Blanc Moussi" in costume

During the parade, the Blancs Moussis shower people with confetti, dance, hit people's heads with inflated pig bladders, and otherwise entertain the crowd by jumping, grunting, imitating others. During the final part of the show on the Saint Remacle square, the Blancs Moussis lead the spectators in farandoles around the monumental fountain. They then put up posters on the house walls and shop windows. These posters feature word games, making fun of local inhabitants for funny or embarrassing incidents during the previous months.

With its 2,200 participants and 35,000 spectators, the Laetare of Stavelot is a very popular festival. It celebrated its half millennium in 2002 and attracted 47,000 people. In 2017, over 500 Blancs Moussis took part, and almost 30,000 spectators were present.

The event is a collective project of the entire city. Each year, there is a parade of local folklore groups but there are also some foreign groups.

This festival is also famous for the abundance of confetti, with confetti cannons that throw more than 5 tons of multicolored paper into the crowd; in recent years this use of confetti has been called into question.
