= Armand Massonet =

Belgian painter

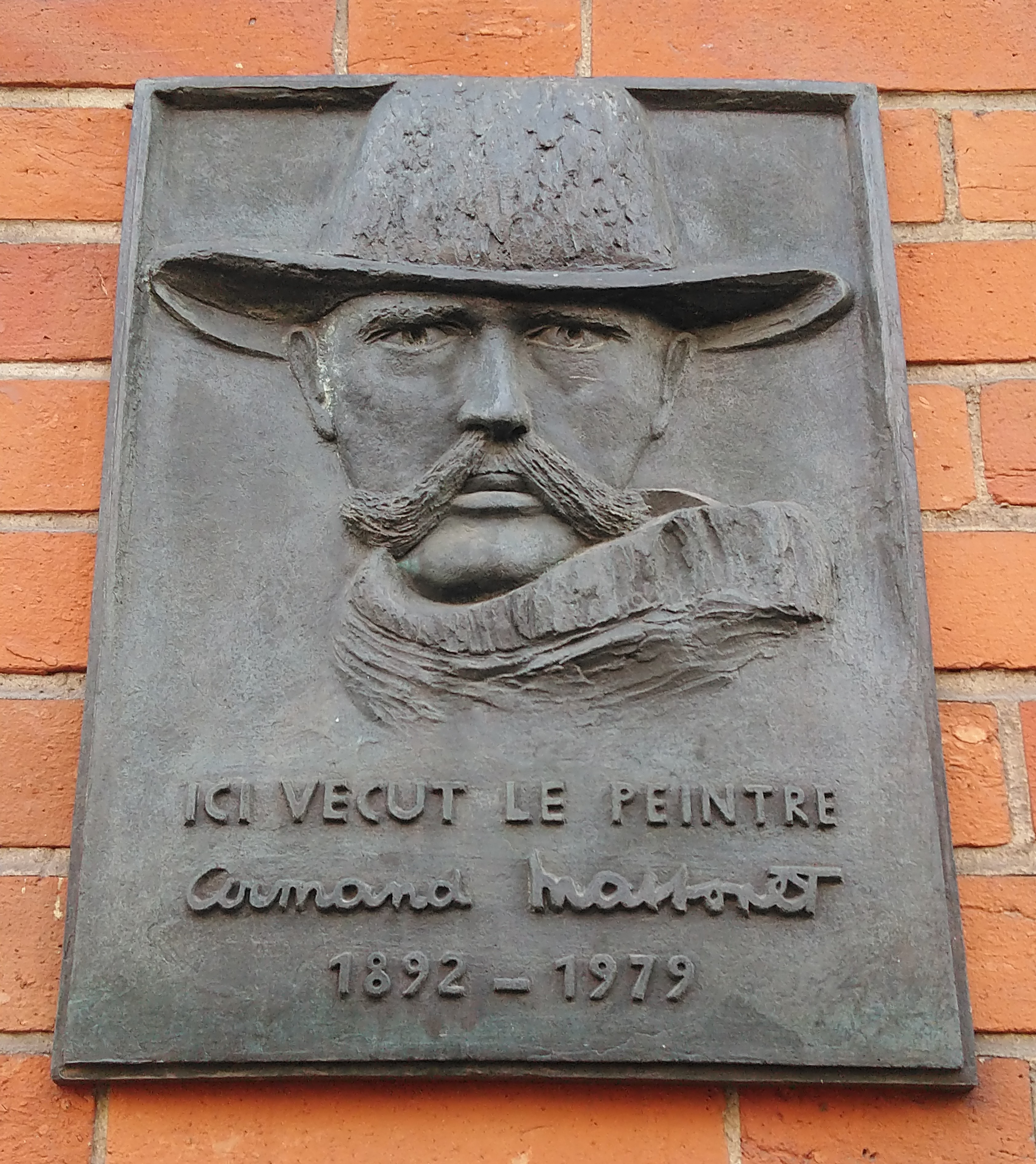
A portrait of Armand Massonet

Armand Massonet (Saint-Gilles, 22 February 1892 – Jette, 11 March 1979) was a Belgian painter.

He studied at the Académie Royale des Beaux-Arts of Brussels and the Ecole National des Beaux-Arts in Paris (in the studio of Fernand Cormon), where he followed the steps of Van Gogh and Toulouse-Lautrec. During World War I, Massonet served as a stretcher-bearer for the Belgian Army while working for the art section of the Army, capturing scenes of war and devastation throughout Belgium. He published an art and literary paper called Le Claque à Fond while on the front line. After the war, he taught drawing in different schools and academies of Brussels while publishing books and articles on art and sketch techniques. He worked with different artists and writers of the time, such as Victor Horta, René Lyr and Victor Boin. After World War II he moved to Paris, where he painted regularly and continued to publish books on art and painting. There he became acquainted with painters such as Vlaminck.

Massonet's work demonstrates a particular skill for sketching and capturing movement and light. As a painter, he produced numerous portraits and views of cities (Brussels, Paris, Venice) as well as interior scenes. His paintings also developed the theme of music and dance, portraying jazz bands and piano players. He produced numerous posters and publicity drawings for companies such as Philips and Agfa-Gevaert.

His work can be found in museums in Brussels, Belgium; Rheims, France; and Riga, Latvia.

== Bibliography ==
- Le Croquis, Brussels, 1926.
- Olympiade, Brussels, 1926.
- Le Corquis au ralentit, Brussels, 1927.
- Le Croquis vivant aquarellé, Paris, 1942.
- Le Dessin sur le Vif, Paris, 1952.
- L'Aquarelle, Paris, 1954.
- La Peinture, Paris, 1960.
- Un Peintre à Paris, Paris, 1964.
- L'art du dessin et de la couleur, Paris, 1965.
- L'homme s'est battu 1918-1968, Brussels, 1967.
