= Peter Colfs =

Belgian painter

- Born: 1906; Antwerp, Belgium
- Died: 1983 (aged 76–77); Antwerp, Belgium
- Occupation: Painter

Peter Colfs (1906–1983) was a Belgian painter. His work was part of the painting event in the art competition at the 1932 Summer Olympics. A tapestry that he designed called Triumph of Peace was gifted to the United Nations in 1954.
