= Gravensteen =

Medieval castle in Ghent, Belgium

- Ghent, East Flanders (Belgium)
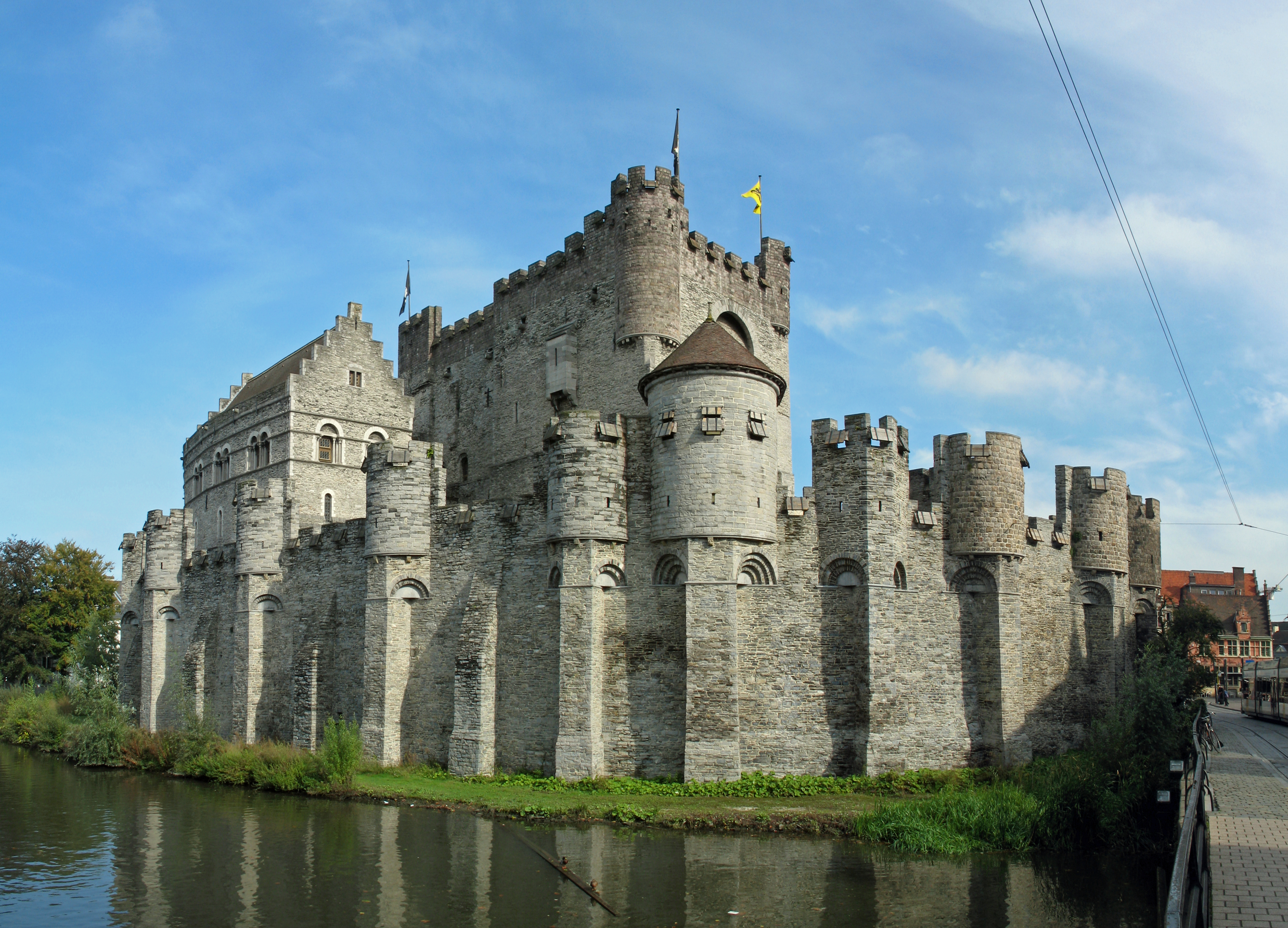
- The Gravensteen, seen from the south-east

Site information
- Type: Castle
- Owner: City of Ghent
- Open to the public: Yes
- Condition: Restored

Location
- Coordinates: 51.057222°N 3.720556°E

Site history
- Built: 1180
- Materials: Sandstone, Tournai limestone

Garrison information
- Occupants: Counts of Flanders (1180–1353)

The Gravensteen (Dutch; lit. 'the Counts' stone [castle]') is a medieval castle in the city of Ghent, East Flanders in Belgium. The current castle dates from 1180 and was the residence of the Counts of Flanders until 1353. It was subsequently re-purposed as a court, prison, mint, and even as a cotton mill. It was restored over 1893–1903 and is now a museum and a major landmark in the city.

== Origins ==
The origins of the Gravensteen date to the reign of Arnulf I (890–965) in the County of Flanders. The site, which sat between two branches of the river Lys, was first fortified around 1000, initially in wood and later in stone. This was soon transformed into a motte-and-bailey castle which was burnt down in around 1176.

The current castle dates to 1180 and was built by Philip of Alsace (1143–1191) on the site of the older fortification. It may have been inspired by crusader castles witnessed by Philip during the Second Crusade. As well as a protective citadel, the Gravensteen was intended to intimidate the burghers of Ghent who often challenged the counts' authority. It incorporates a large central donjon, a residence and various smaller buildings. These are surrounded by a fortified, oval-shaped enceinte lined with 24 small échauguettes. It also has a sizeable moat, fed with water from the Lys.

From 1180 until 1353, the Gravensteen was the residence of the Counts of Flanders. The decision to leave was taken by Louis of Male (1330–1384) who transferred the court to the nearby Hof ten Walle.

The foot of a wolf was once nailed to the gate and provides the last known archaeozoological evidence for the wolf in Flanders.

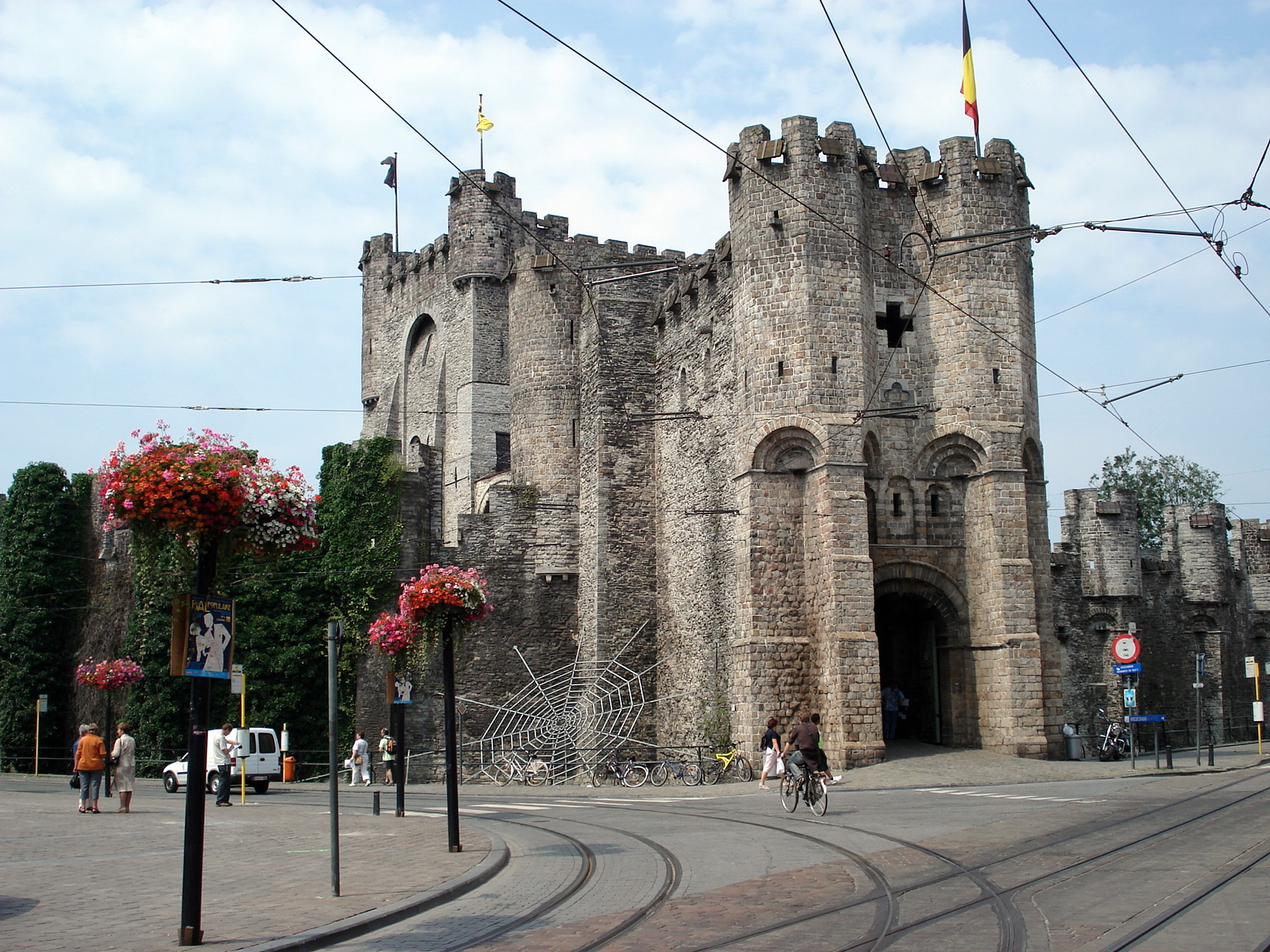
External view of the gatehouse

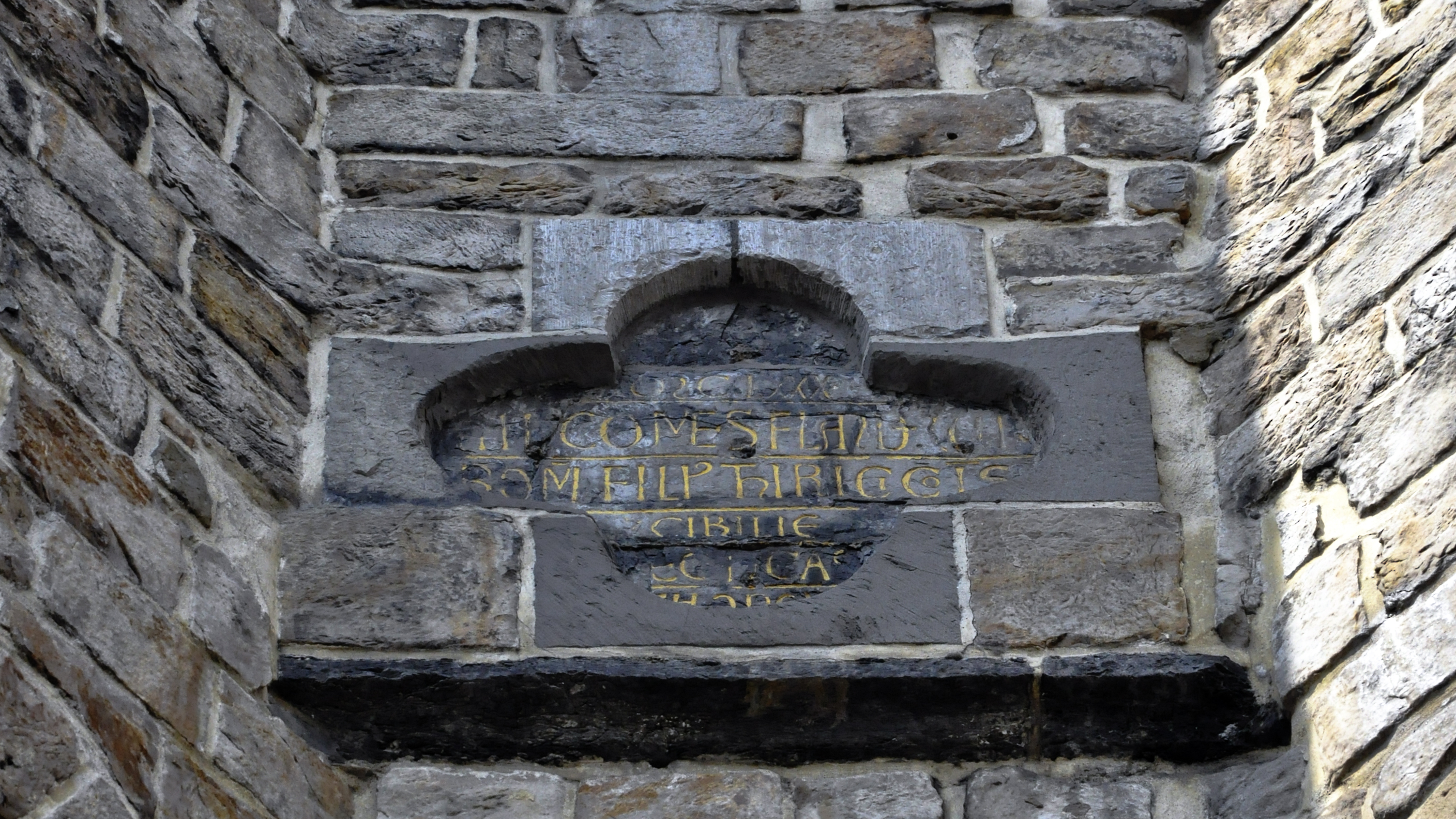
The dedication stone, dating to 1180

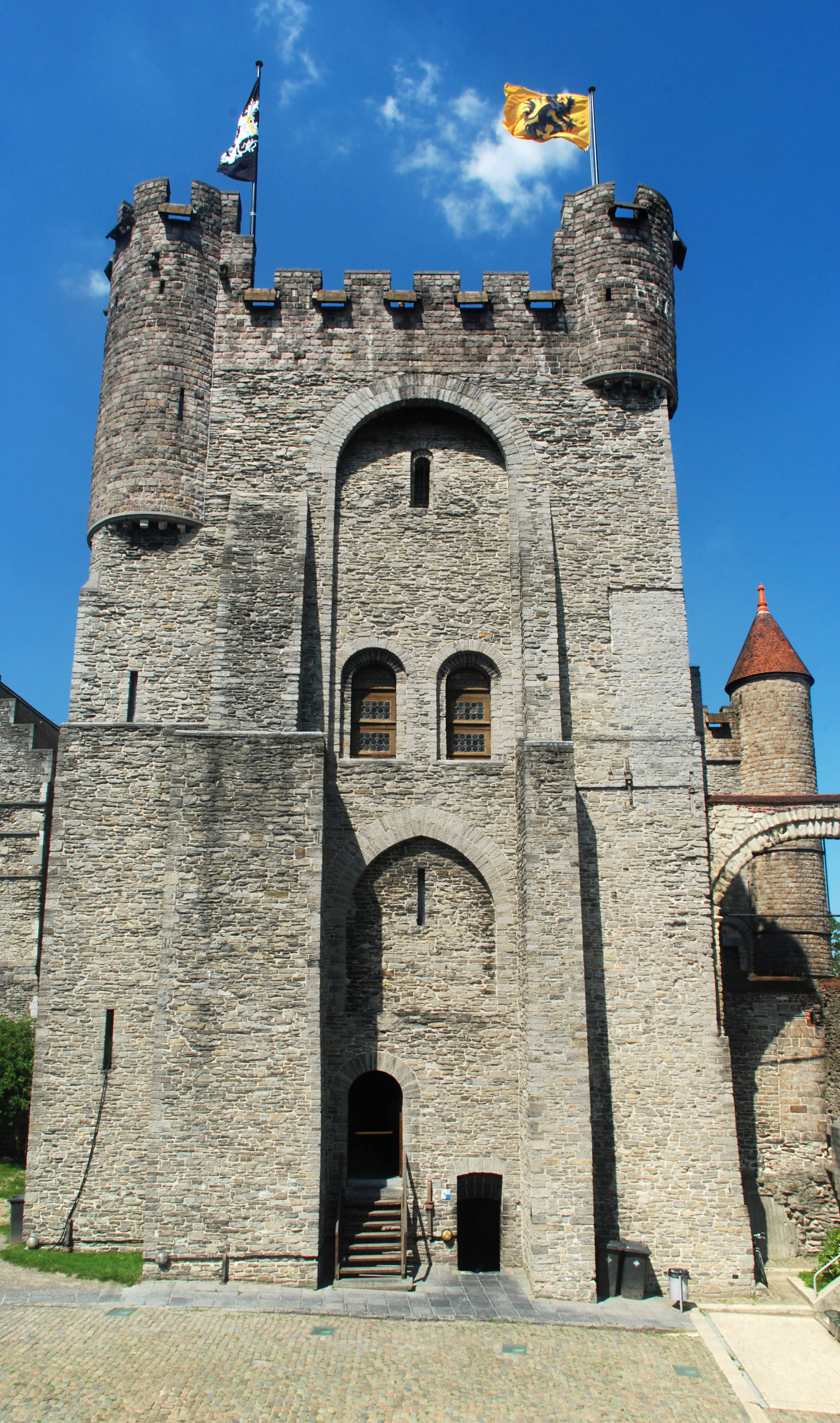
View of the south side of the donjon

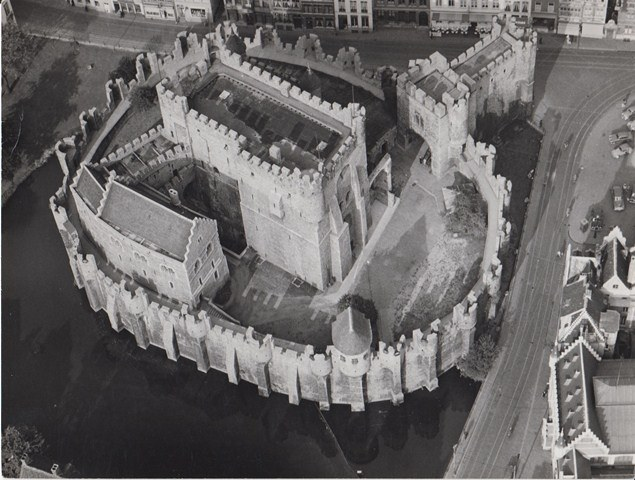
Aerial view of the castle, c.1970

== Subsequent history ==
After ceasing to be the residence of the counts of Flanders, the castle entered a decline. It was used as a court and prison until the 18th century. From 1353 to 1491, it was the site of Ghent's mint. Private buildings were constructed on or around the medieval remains. Ghent emerged as a major centre for textile manufacturing during the Industrial Revolution in the 19th century, and the Gravensteen was converted into a cotton mill. It was at one point scheduled for demolition.

Parts of the castle were bought up gradually by the City of Ghent, which began a major restoration in a romanticising Gothic style between 1893 and 1907 under the architect Joseph De Waele. De Waele was inspired the approach of the French architect Eugène Viollet-le-Duc and attempted to restore the castle to its imagined appearance in the 12th century. Many details added during this period, such as the flat roofs and the windows of the eastern outbuilding, are not thought to be historically accurate.

The Gravensteen was the centrepiece of the Ghent World Fair of 1913 during which the city centre was significantly reshaped. It remains open to the public.

Students from Ghent University occupied the castle on 16 November 1949 in protest against a new tax against beer. The occupation, referred to popularly as the "Battle of Gravensteen" (Slag om het Gravensteen), involved 138 students who seized the castle buildings, lowered the portcullis, and barricaded the castle gate. A guard on duty at the time was captured and locked in a closet. After raising banners along the castle walls and pelting passing police officers with rotten fruit, they were eventually detained and removed from the castle, though a public outcry of support led to none of the students being prosecuted for their actions. Their campaign against the beer tax was unsuccessful.

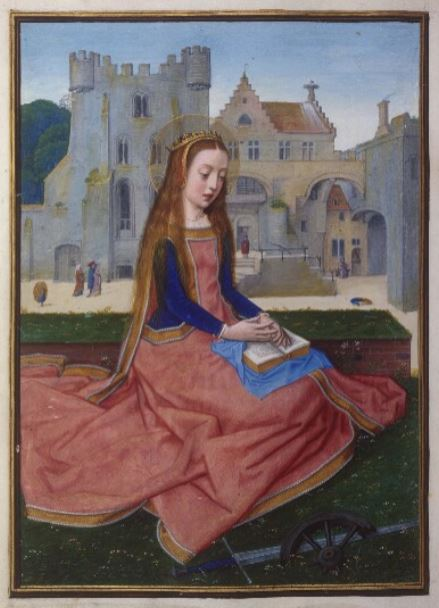
Catherine of Alexandria seated in front of the donjon inside the castle. Illumination by Simon Bening from the manuscript Hortulus Animae (1510)

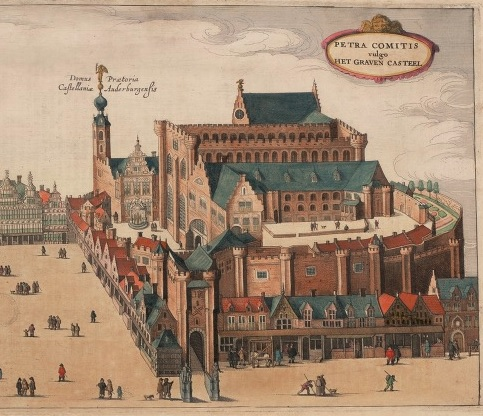
The Gravensteen, depicted in Flandria Illustrata (1641)

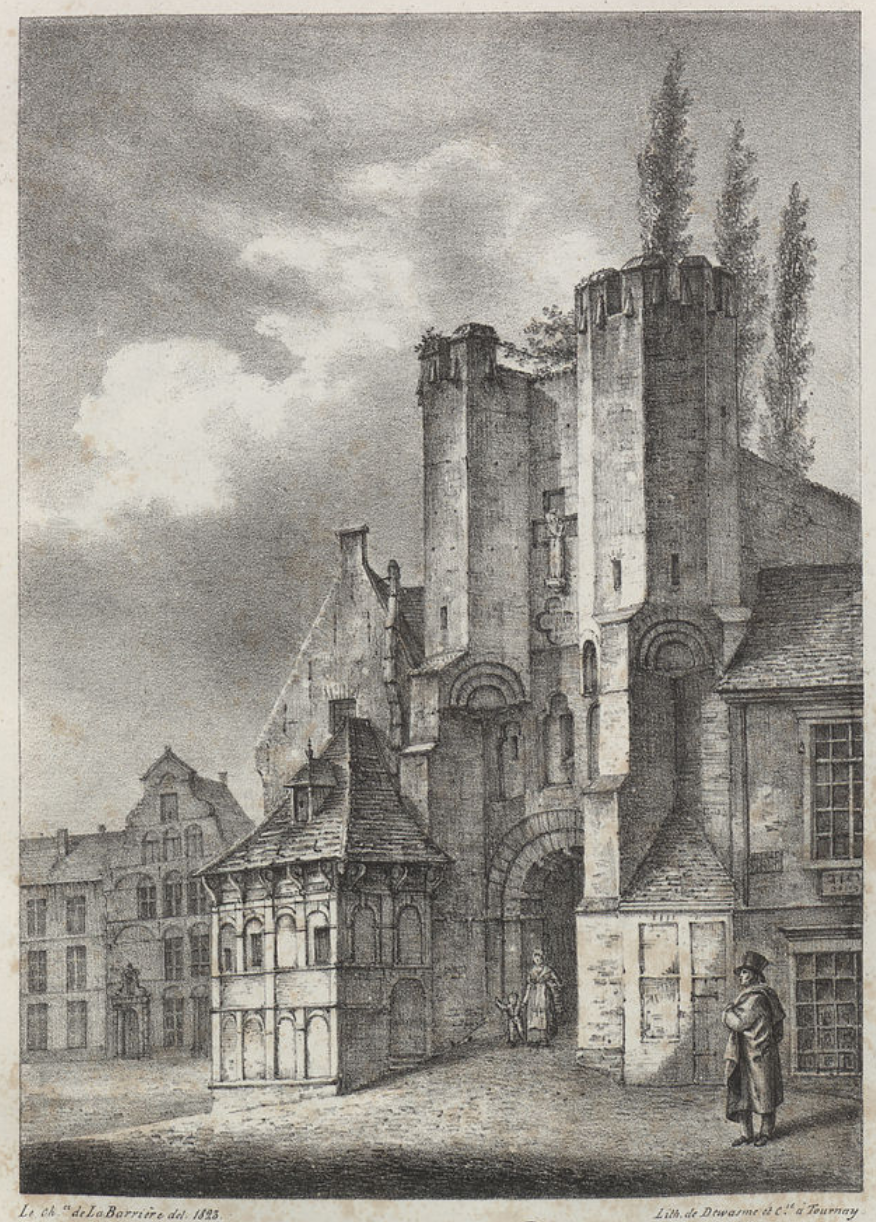
View of the Gravensteen's gatehouse in 1823, prior to the restoration

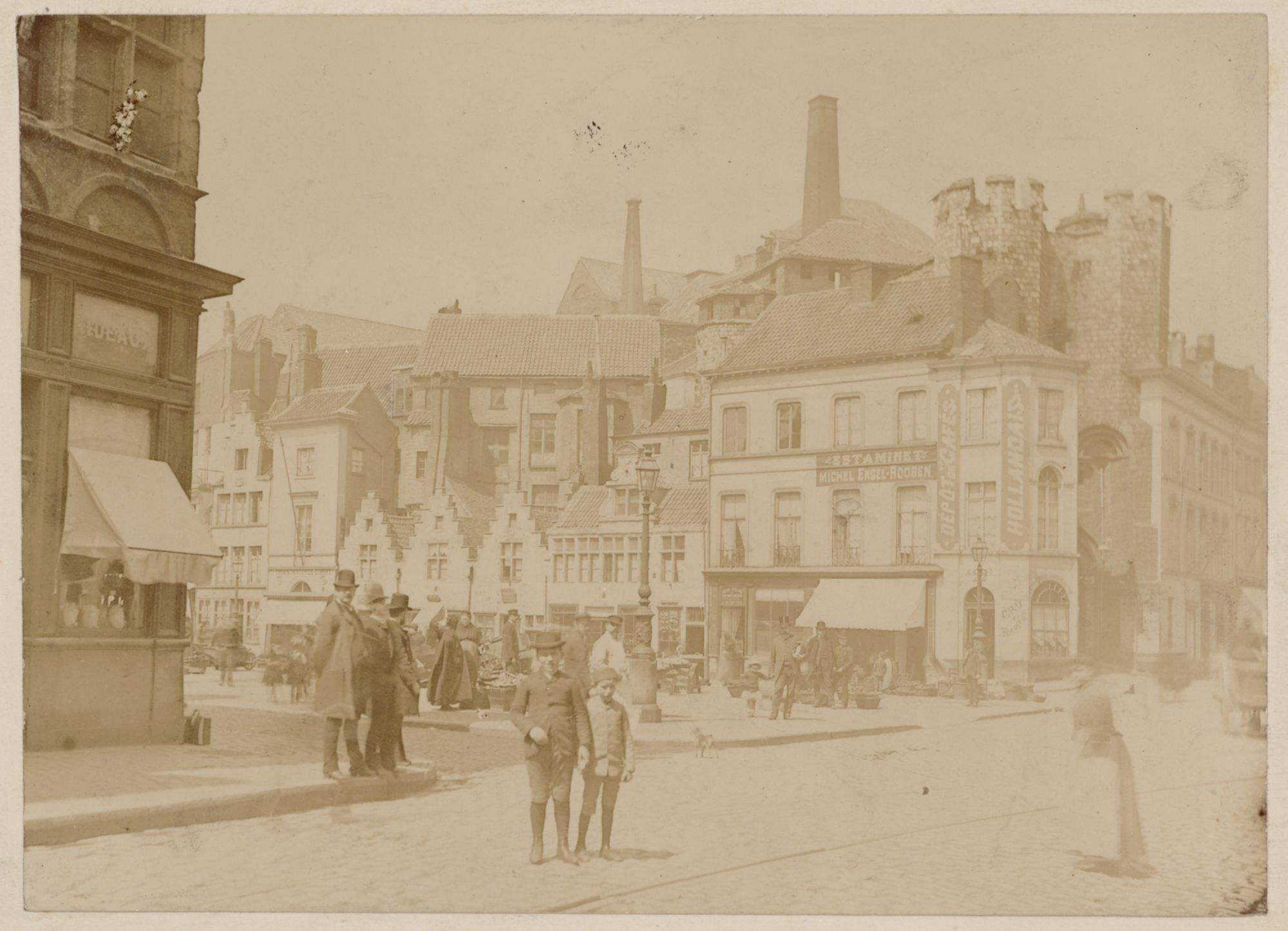
Photo of the castle before the restoration, c.1880. The factory buildings are still visible.

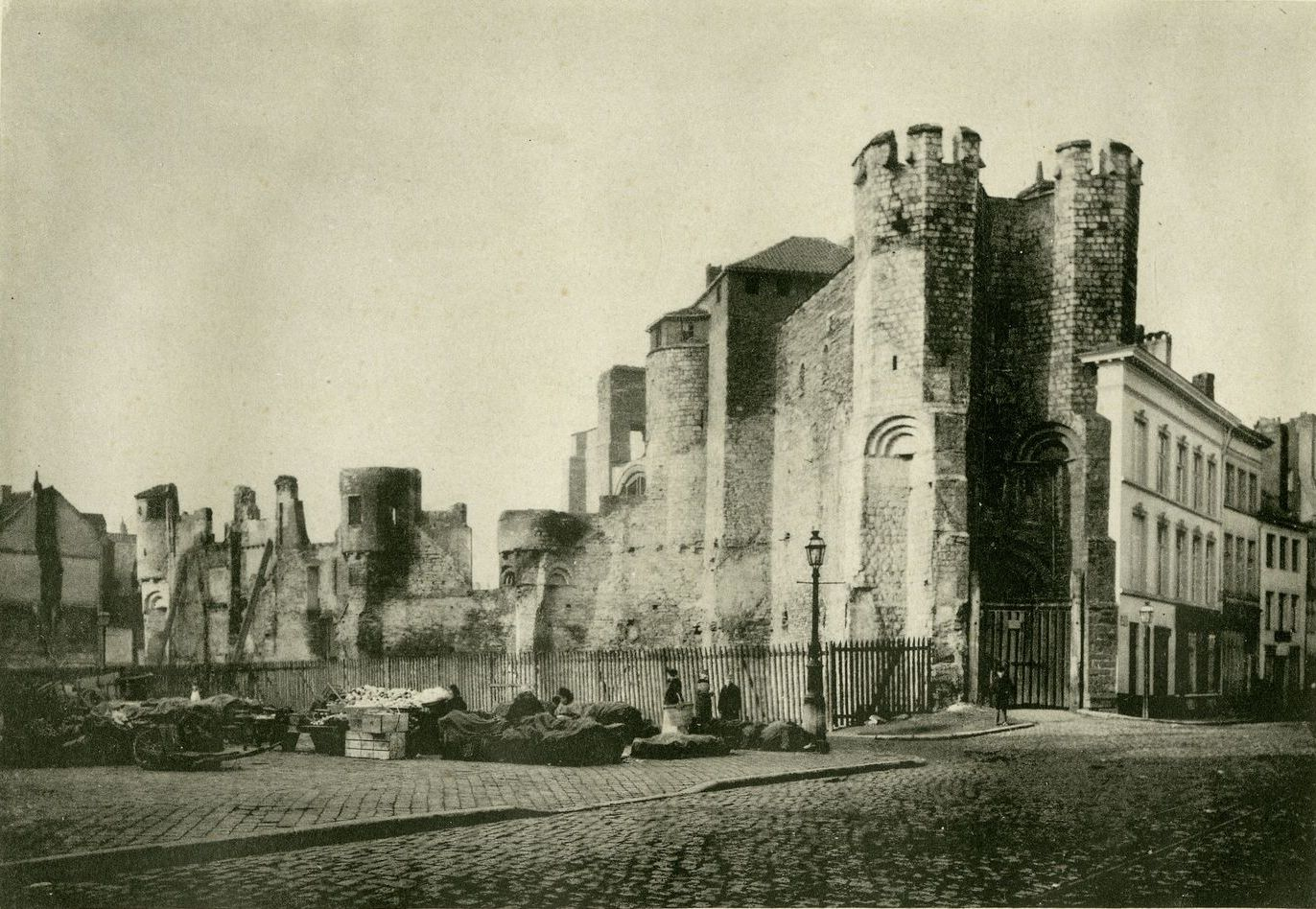
The castle, pictured in 1893 during the restoration work. The buildings around the castle have been demolished.

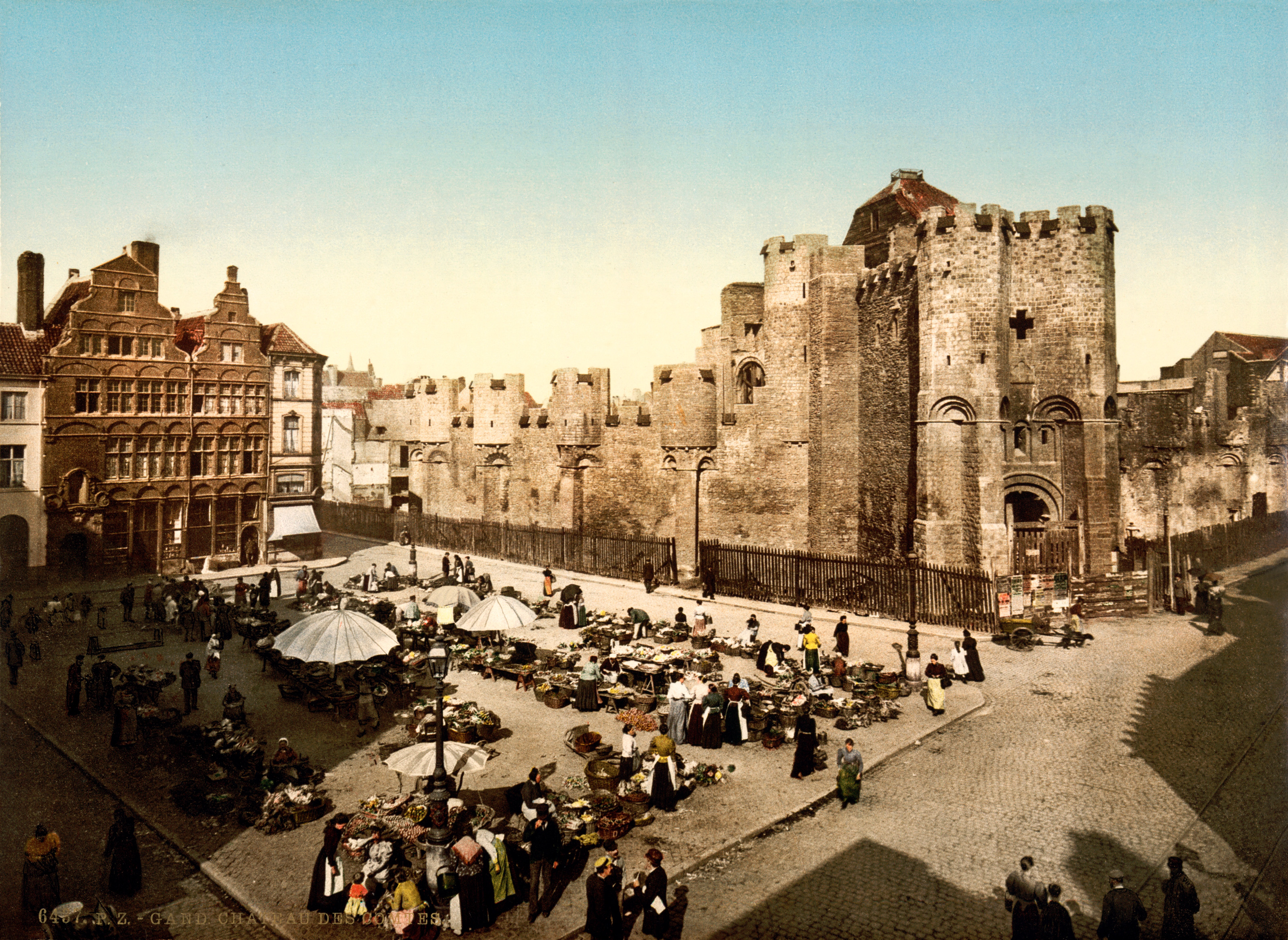
Photochrom picture of the castle in the later stages of the restoration, c.1900

== See also ==
- List of castles in Belgium
