= Guntram the Rich =

10th-century German nobleman

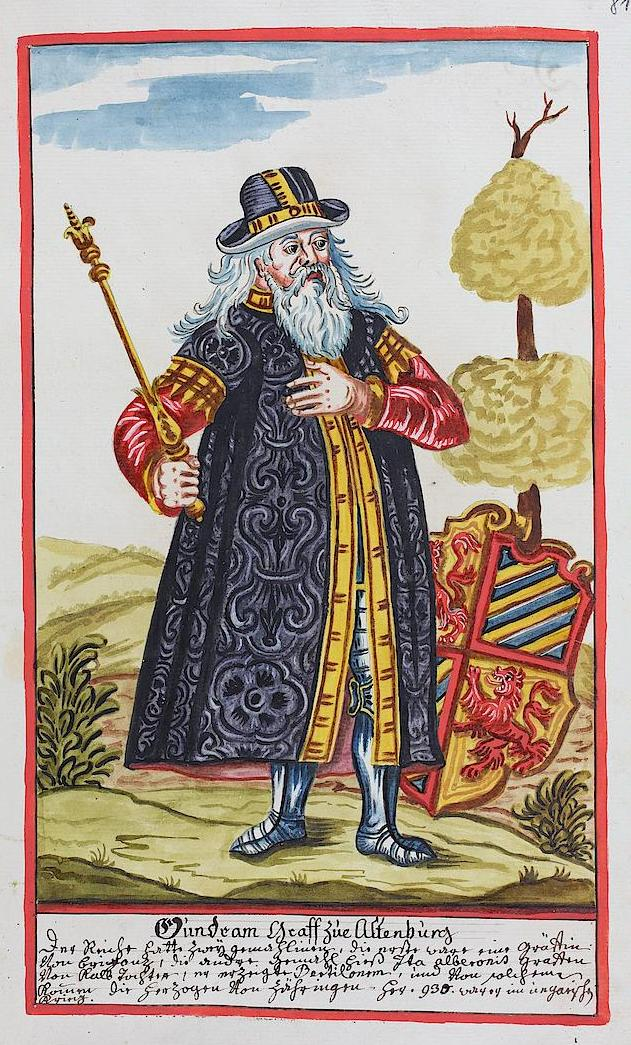
- Born: c. 920
- Died: 26 March 973
- Noble family: Etichonids; House of Habsburg (progenitor)
- Issue: Lanzelin of Klettgau

Guntram the Rich (Latin: Guntramnus Dives, German: Guntram der Reiche, c. 920 – 26 March 973) was a count in Breisgau, member of the noble family of the Etichonids, and possibly the progenitor of the House of Habsburg.

== History ==
A member of the Eberhard branch of the Etichonids noble family, one of the most influential families on both sides of Upper Rhine, Guntram possessed lands in Alsace and in Breisgau, from Vogesen to Kaiserstuhl and the Black Forest.

Many of Guntram's possessions had been given to him by the king. In August 952, Guntram the Rich was convicted of treachery during an Imperial Diet in Augsburg, which resulted in King Otto the Great removing these lands from him. Guntram was, however, able to keep his possessions in Alsace, Breisgau, and near Aare and Reuß. The political influence of Guntram's family was restored by his grandsons. One of them, Radbot, a count in Klettgau, founded the Muri Abbey, which became the first burial place of members of the House of Habsburg. It is possible that Radbot founded the castle Habichtsburg, the residence of the House of Habsburg, but another possible founder is Werner I.

The chronology of the Muri Abbey, written in the 11th century, states that Guntramnus Dives (Guntram the Rich) was the progenitor of the House of Habsburg. Many historians believe this indeed makes Guntram the progenitor of the House of Habsburg; however, much about him and the origins of the Habsburgs is uncertain.

== Family ==
Guntram had the following issue:

- Lanzelin of Klettgau. His son was:
  - Radbot, Count of Habsburg.
  - Rudolf of Altenburg, buried Ottmarsheim abbey
