= Erasmus of Strasbourg =

Erasmus of Strasbourg, Erasmus of Limbourg or Erasme Schenk von Limpurg-Gaildorf (7 August 1507 - 27 November 1568) was a Roman Catholic bishop.

As with his predecessor Wilhelm von Hohnstein, Erasmus had the misfortune to be elected during a politically and religiously tumultuous era that saw a schism between the free imperial city of Strasbourg and the episcopal principality of Strasbourg, with the former becoming a bastion of Protestantism and a refuge for Protestant refugees from the rest of Europe and the latter trying to check the inexorable progress of Lutheranism among canons in Strasbourg's different chapters.

As with other prince-bishops in dynamic cities developing economically and culturally, Erasmus surrounded himself with advisors from the mercantile and bourgeois class rather than lawyers, doctors, intellectuals and ecclesiastics in order to counterbalance the Protestant urban mercantile and bourgeois class, favouring teaching, humanism and the arts. These advisors were omnipresent in current affairs and diplomatic circles and at their head was chancellor Christophe Welsinger. Erasmus was a peaceful man and friend of the sciences, but left the bishopric's government to his many advisors, particularly Welsinger, which (according to Johannes Friese's account in an 18th century children's history book on Strasbourg) did not benefit the city.

== Life ==
=== Early life ===
He was born in Gaildorf and as a youth studied maths at the University of Tübingen under Jean Stoller before switching to law under professors Conrad Braun and Jean Marquard Next he moved to Paris to be taught law by Johannes Sturm. (Note: Erasmus met Sturm again during the former's time as bishop when Jacob Sturm von Sturmeck asked Johannes to come to teach dialectics and rhetoric. There he founded the Protestant Gymnasium, the forerunner of the Protestant Academy of 1566, which in turn became the University of Strasbourg in 1621. Previously the inhabitants of Alsace had to study at Tübingen, other German universities such as those in Göttingen, Fribourg and Heidelberg), or in Switzerland, France or Italy (specifically Basel, Bologna, Padua or Paris).) In 1541, therefore, he had already gained a reputation for his quick wit and love of learning. He served as a canon in Strasbourg and at the collegiate church in Bamberg, then provost of the collegiate church at Surbourg - none of these roles required the holder to be a priest.

=== Election ===
He was elected bishop of Strasbourg on 11 August 1541 and that election was confirmed by pope Paul III on 9 December the same year. He was not then a priest and so initially he was helped by a titular bishop Jean Delphius, bishop of Tripoli. He was ordained priest in Saverne in 1549. He remained bishop until his death, during the reigns of Charles V, Ferdinand I and Maximilian II and the pontificates from Paul III to Pius V. As prince-bishop of Strasbourg he was also Landgrave of Lower Alsace.

=== Relations with Protestants ===
The day after Erasmus' election as bishop, Martin Bucer wrote to his friend Ambrosius Blarer that "The man elected is one of integrity and he loves our religion. Nobody more tolerant could have been chosen from the whole chapter. The Lord gives him [to us] in response to our expectation.". More and more meetings between Protestants and Catholics were happening at this time, such as the 1540 Haguenau conference, the 1540-1541 Worms colloquium and the 1541 Diet of Regensburg. The general situation seemed to favour opening up dialogue at the local level between the Bishop of Strasbourg and Protestant reformers in that city and so they met at Molsheim on 18 October 1542. Bucer and Caspar Hedio represented the pastors, Pierre Sturtri, Matthis Pfarrer and Martin Herlin were the delegates sent by Strasbourg's Magistracy, and the cathedral's main chapter sent its dean Christophe von Simmern, count Bernard von Eberstein and his lawyer Tuchelin.

Erasmus personally took part in the conference, assisted by his advisors. Chancellor Welsinger was the Catholic party's spokesman. The conference ran into difficulties as all parties tried to ensure that their viewpoint prevailed, with their positions proving irreconcilable, even if the conference had at least reopened channels of communication between them.

=== Counter-Reformation ===
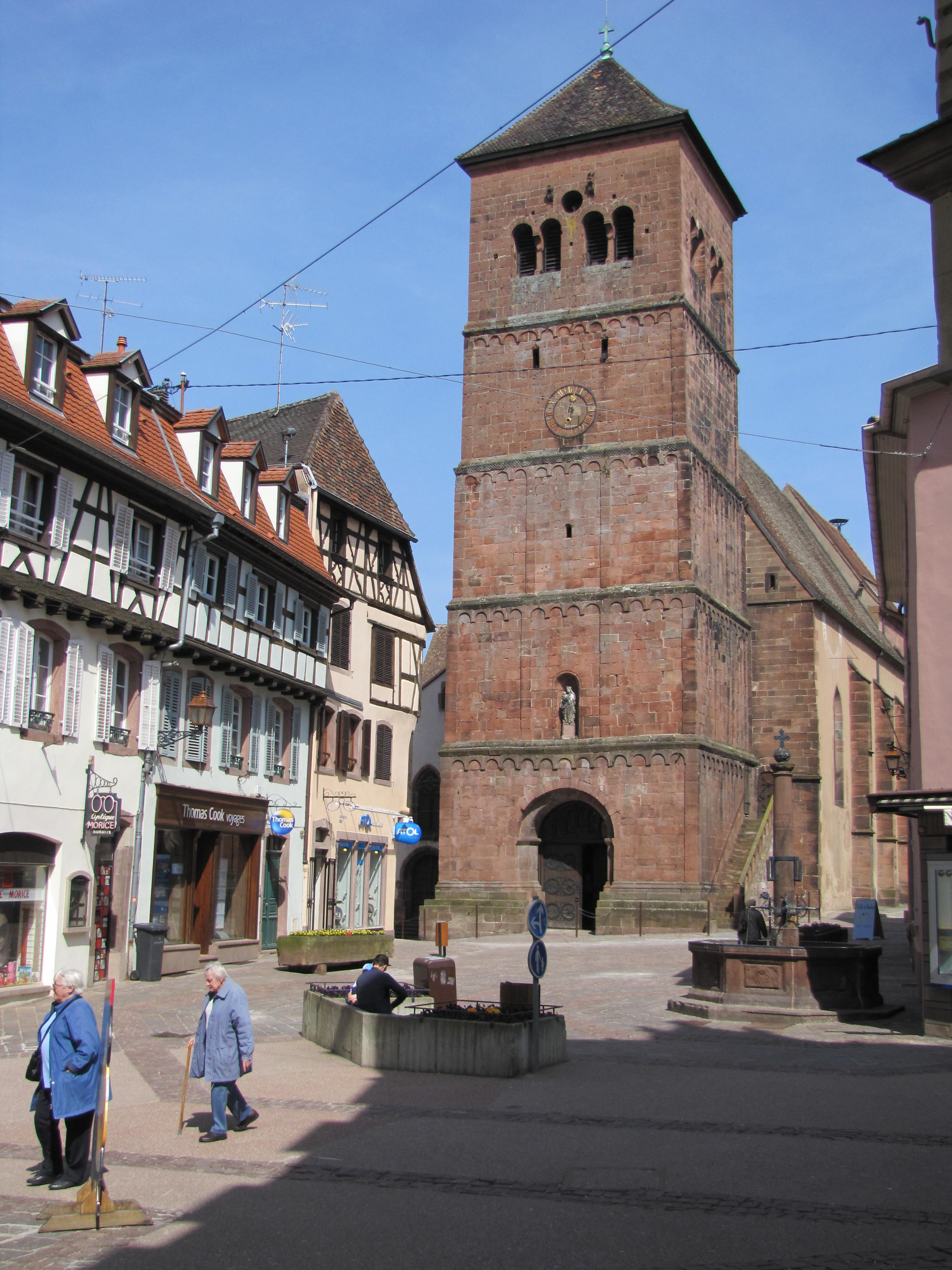
Notre-Dame-de-la-Nativité de Saverne.

Powerless to stop "the schism which had invaded almost all his diocese and which, here and there, had infected and contaminated the whole diocese", Erasmus tried to re-establish ecclesiastical discipline in areas still under his control. To that end he summoned two diocesan synods at Saverne in 1549 and 1560. Their decisions were then published in statutes and decrees of Strasbourg's diocesan synod, edited in Mainz in 1566. This was a vast reform programme like the Protestant church ordinances, covering faith ("credenda"), worship ("veneranda") and discipline ("facienda"). Despite their scope, this reform programme was an attempt at a local Catholic Reformation or counter-reformation. However, it started too late to be effective and Erasmus lacked men able to re-take the initiative against the Protestants.

== Death ==
He died at Saverne without having begun the hoped-for work and was buried in the Rosary chapel in the collegiate church in that city (now Notre-Dame-de-la-Nativité). His epitaph translates as:

Here rests Erasmus, bishop of Strasbourg, Landgrave of Alsace, who fell asleep in Christ on 28 November 1568, in the 27th year of his prelacy.

whilst the longer inscription on his mausoleum in the same church translates as:

Erasmus, bishop of Strasbourg, provincial count of Alsace, born of the illustrious and ever-free Pincer family of the holy empire; for three months and fifteen days, he presided over his church [and] the flock and subjects entrusted to him, in hard and unjust times, in all peace and tranquility, laudably avoiding injury and offence to his neighbours and to all; finally, on 27th November, at twelve o'clock at night, truly confessing the Catholic religion, with a feeling of piety, piously and peacefully in Christ, not without grave mourning for the entire province and all the good, he fell asleep in the Lord in the 61st year of his age, in the year of human salvation, 1568.

== Coat of arms ==
His family coat of arms (that of the barons and counts of Limpurg-Gaildorf, which is also found in the Limpurg-Söntheim coat of arms) was quartered: the first and fourth five maces arranged 3 and 2 on an azure background; second and third, four silver handles on a gules background. This is the coat of arms

As Bishop of Strasbourg, Erasmus bore a quartered coat of arms: first gules, a bend argent, the emblem of the Bishopric of Strasbourg; second gules, with four silver handles; third azure, with five maces arranged 3 and 2; and fourth gules, with a bend flory argent (emblem of the Landgraviate of Lower Alsace). The crest featured two simple buffalo horns, gules and argent, the emblem of Franconia. The mantling was azure and silver.

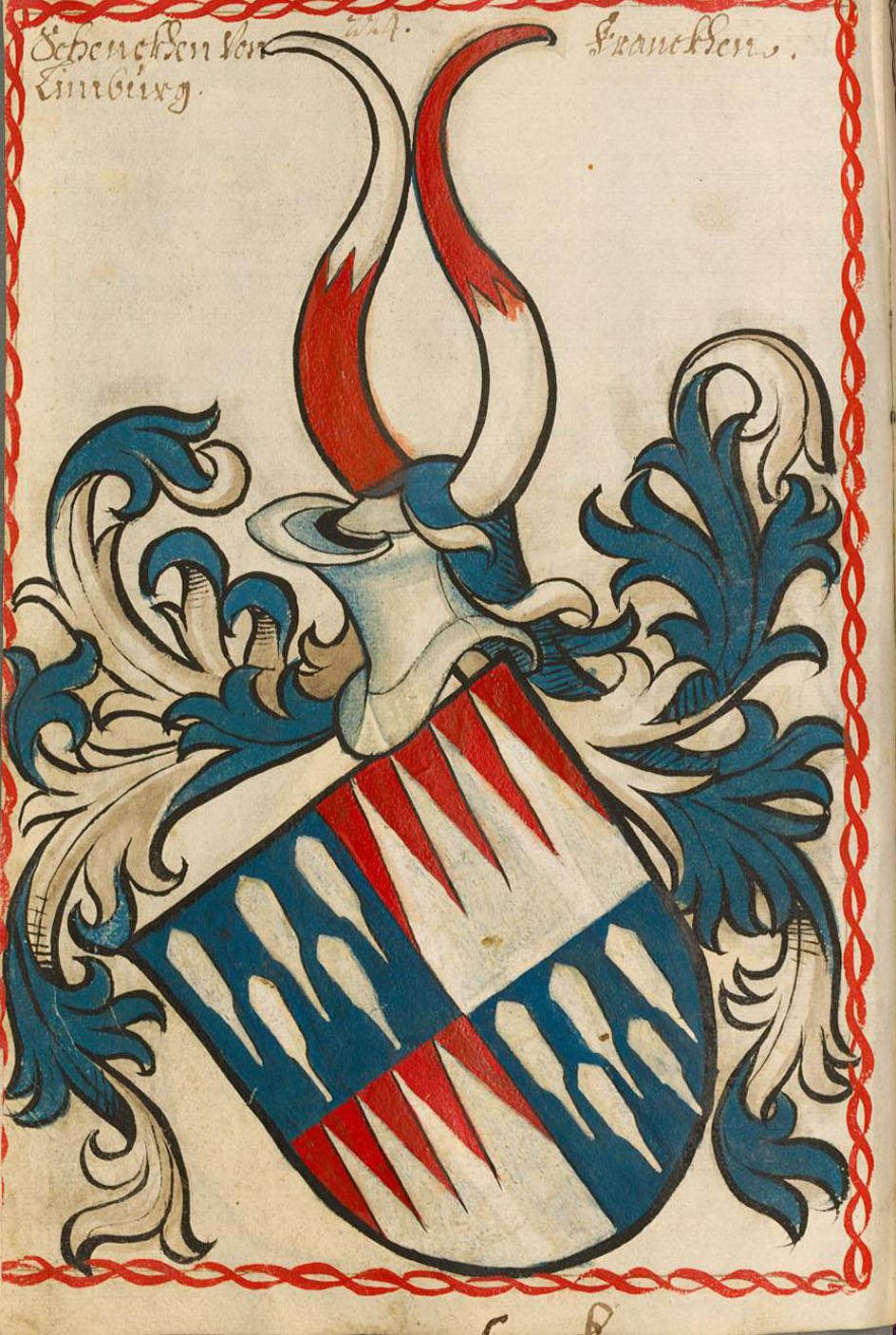
The family coat of arms.

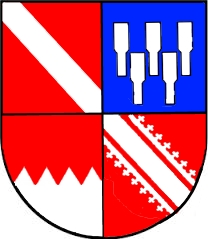
Erasmus's coat of arms as bishop.

== Bibliography ==
- (in French) André Marcel Burg, « Erasmus Limburg (Erasme de Limbourg) », in Nouveau dictionnaire de biographie alsacienne, vol. 24, p. 2373
- (in German) Karl Hahn, Die katholische Kirsche in Strasburg unter dem Bischof Erasmus von Limburg.
- (in French) Lettre de M. Bucer à A. Blaurer, 13 août 1541, Schless, 2, no. 910, p. Et 6 octobre 1541, no. 913, p. 87.
- (in French) Jacques-Auguste de Thou, Histoire de mon temps, Livres 5 et 43.
- (in Latin) Francisci Guillimanni, De episcopis Argentinensibus liber commentarius : quo super episcoporum seriem, gesta, & quamplurium veras genealogias : opidorum, urbium, in primis amplissimae civitatis Argentinae, Itemq monasteriorum, collegiorum, aliorum locorum sacrorum episcopatus, origines, incrementa, conversiones, Friburgi Brisgoiae : apud Josephum Langium, 1608
- (in Latin) Denis de Sainte-Marthe, Gallia Christiana.
- (in French) Le grand Dictionnaire historique de Moréri, Tome IV, 1759.
- (in French) La Réforme protestante du culte à Strasbourg au XVIe siècle (1523-1598)
