= Wilhelm von Hohnstein =

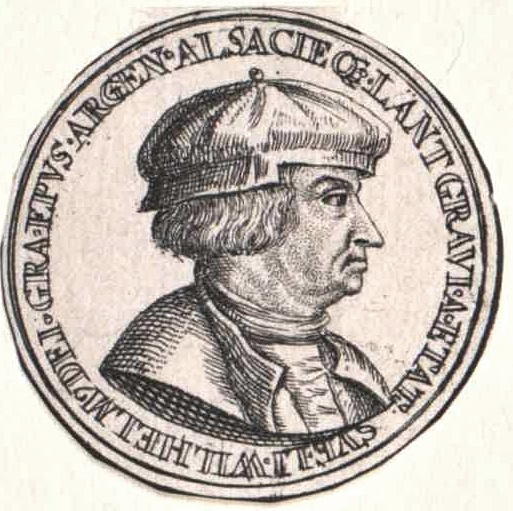
Wilhelm, 1540.

Wilhelm von Hohnstein or Honstein (1466 - 29 June 1541) was prince bishop of Strasbourg from 1506 to 1541 under Maximilian I and Charles V and the papacies of Julius II, Leo X, Adrian VI, Clement VII and Paul III. He was assisted by a titular bishop, initially Johann Ortwin bishop of Mathones, then Konrad Wickgram bishop of Dunes.

His episcopate, like that of his successor, was very representative of the medieval and modern history of Alsace and Strasbourg, in illustrating the complex mechanisms of Holy Roman Empire's geopolitics in a troubled era marked by the arrival of the Protestant Reformation, the Alsace anchorage's place in a then largely German-speaking Rhine basin, and tensions between Strasbourg (a multiconfessional and multicultural free imperial city) and the prince bishopric deep in Lower Alsace with a diocese which formerly extended beyond the modern-day frontiers of Alsace and France.

Wilhelm and his brother Francis originated in Thuringia, showing how the influence of the chapters, collegiate churches and cathedrals of Strasbourg extended beyond its region, with the city's nobles proud of being prebendary canons like the chapters in Cologne, Speyer, Worms, Mainz and Bamberg. Very many major clerics, reformers and politicians in Strasbourg under Wilhelm did not come from Strasbourg or Alsace but a larger interconnected territory between Lorraine and Swabia and between the Rhineland and Switzerland. Despite their diverse origins, several major figures in 16th century Strasbourg's political and theological life totally identified themselves with that city's future, meaning their lives are more often linked to the history of Strasbourg than of the city where they were born - Wilhelm himself is one example, as are the Erasmus of Strasbourg from Franconia, Jean Sturm from Westphalia, Nikolaus Gerbel and Christophe Welsinger from Baden and Johannes Sleidanus from Luxembourg.

== Family ==
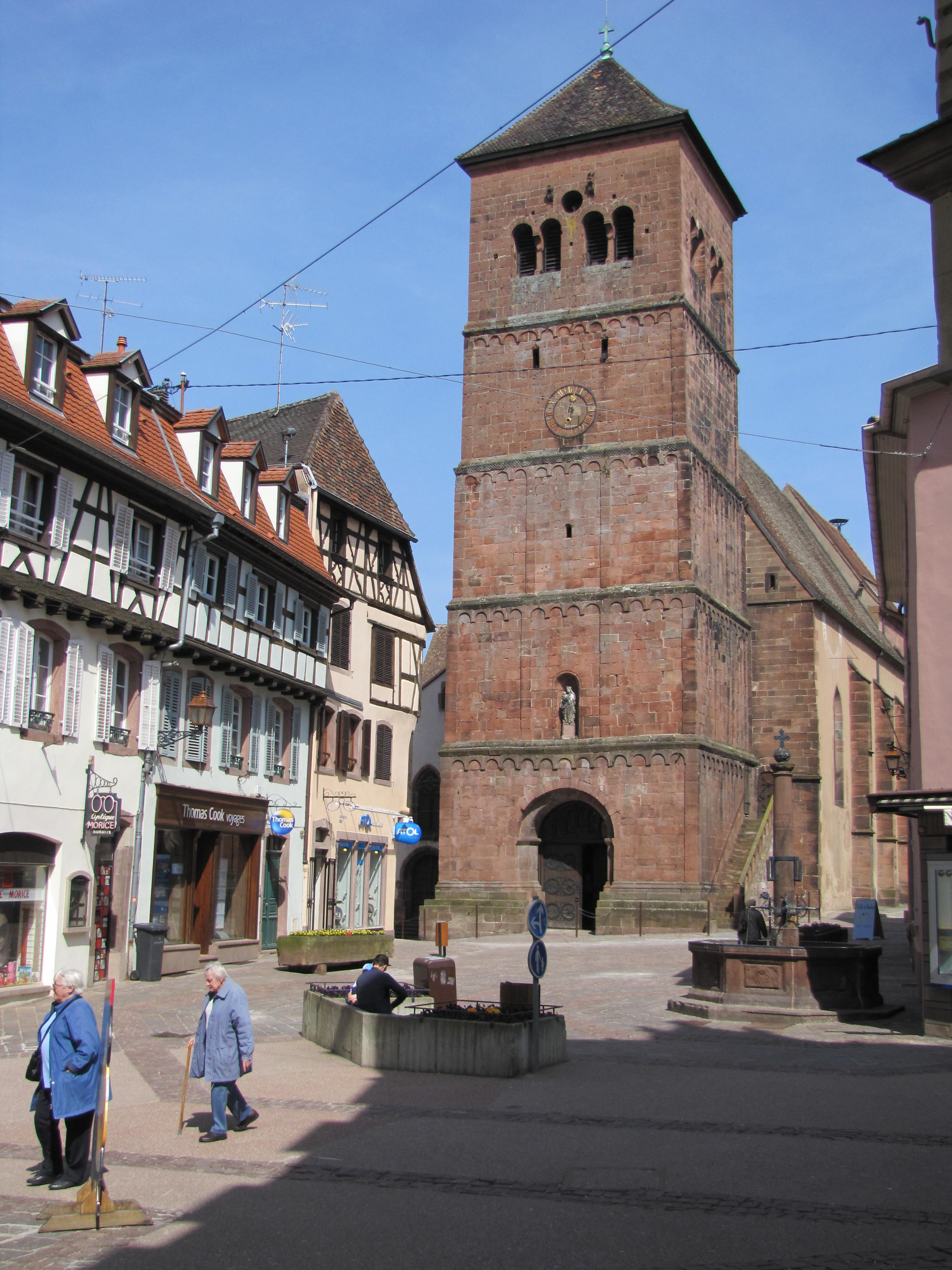
Church of Notre-Dame-de-la-Nativité, Saverne, Bas-Rhin

He came from a noble family in Thuringia. His parents were Ernest IV, count of Hohnstein (1440 - 1508) and his wife Anna-Margaretha von Gera. This made his paternal grandparents Heinrich XI ('the Rash'; 1402-1454) and countess Margareta von Waldeck. Ernest IV also had a son by his 1498 second marriage to Félicité de Beichlingen, Francis von Hohenstein, who became a canon in the chapter of Strasbourg Cathedral and provost at Saverne in 1512. Due to a lack of male issue, the county of Hohnstein passed to other dynastic houses such as the kings of Prussia.

Wilhelm is buried to the right of the altar in the choir of the collegiate church in Saverne, now known as Notre-Dame-de-la-Nativité. His tomb inscription translates as:

Here lies Wilhelm III, count of Hohnstein, elected bishop of Strasbourg on 9 October 1506, generous towards the chapter of Saverne. Died 29 June in the year 1541.

Francis is also buried there, with his inscription translated as "Count von Hohnstein, lord of Lohra and Klettenberg, canon of the insignia church of Strasbourg".

== Pre-episcopate ==
Wilhelm studied at the universities of Freiburg and Pavia before serving as vicar general to his uncle Berthold von Henneberg, Archbishop of Mainz. That role was the head of government of an episcopal principality on behalf of the dicoesan curia, alongside the judicial vicar administering justice and the chancellor the archives and general administration. Wilhelm was a canon of Cologne and Mainz (1482-1488) and of Strasbourg (1488 - 1506) and 'custode' of the collegiate church of St. John's Church, Mainz (1499-1507), and provost of St. Petri Church, Jechaburg (now a Protestant church in a suburb of Sondershausen).

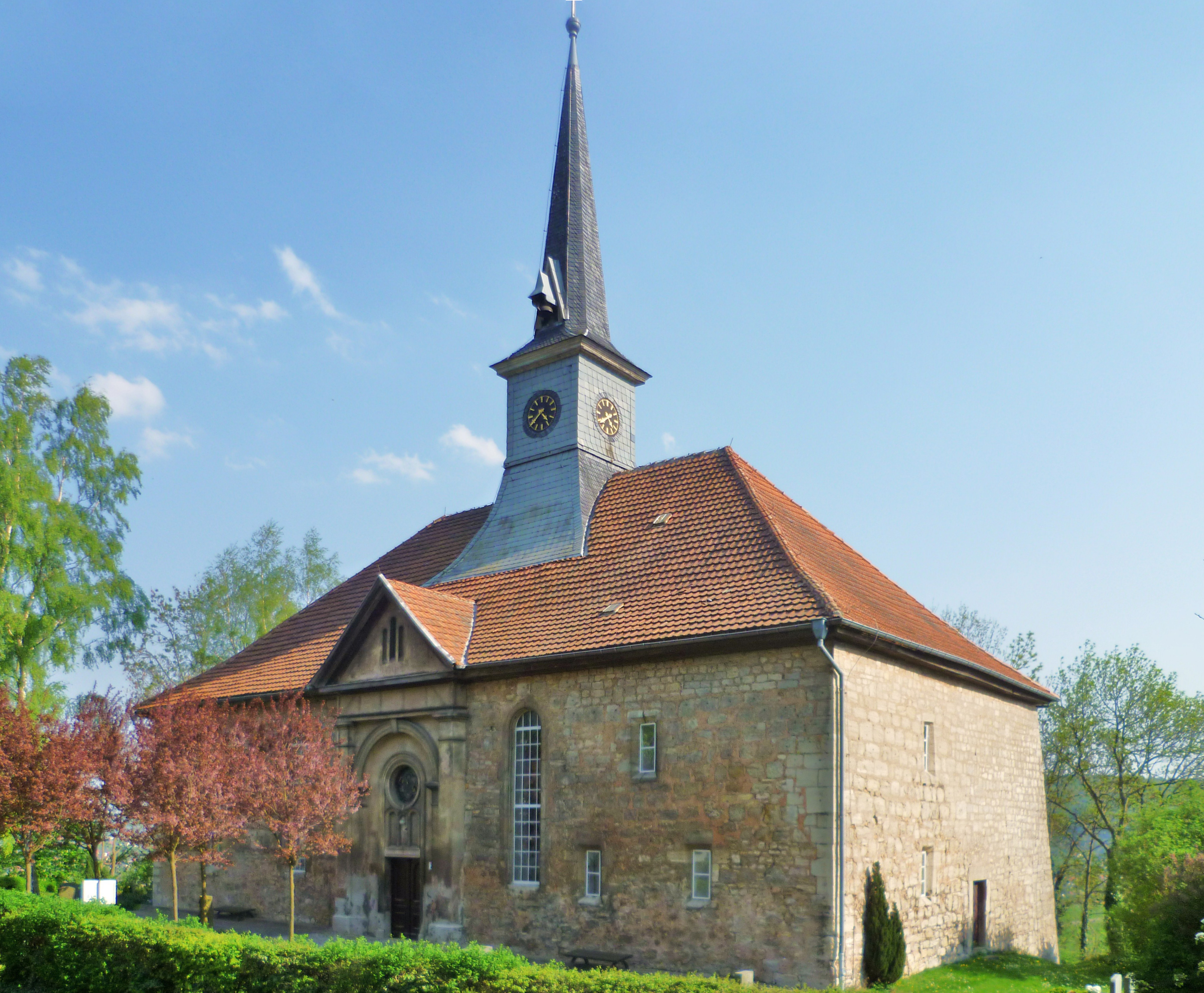
St. Petri Church, a former collegiate church in Jechaburg in Thuringia

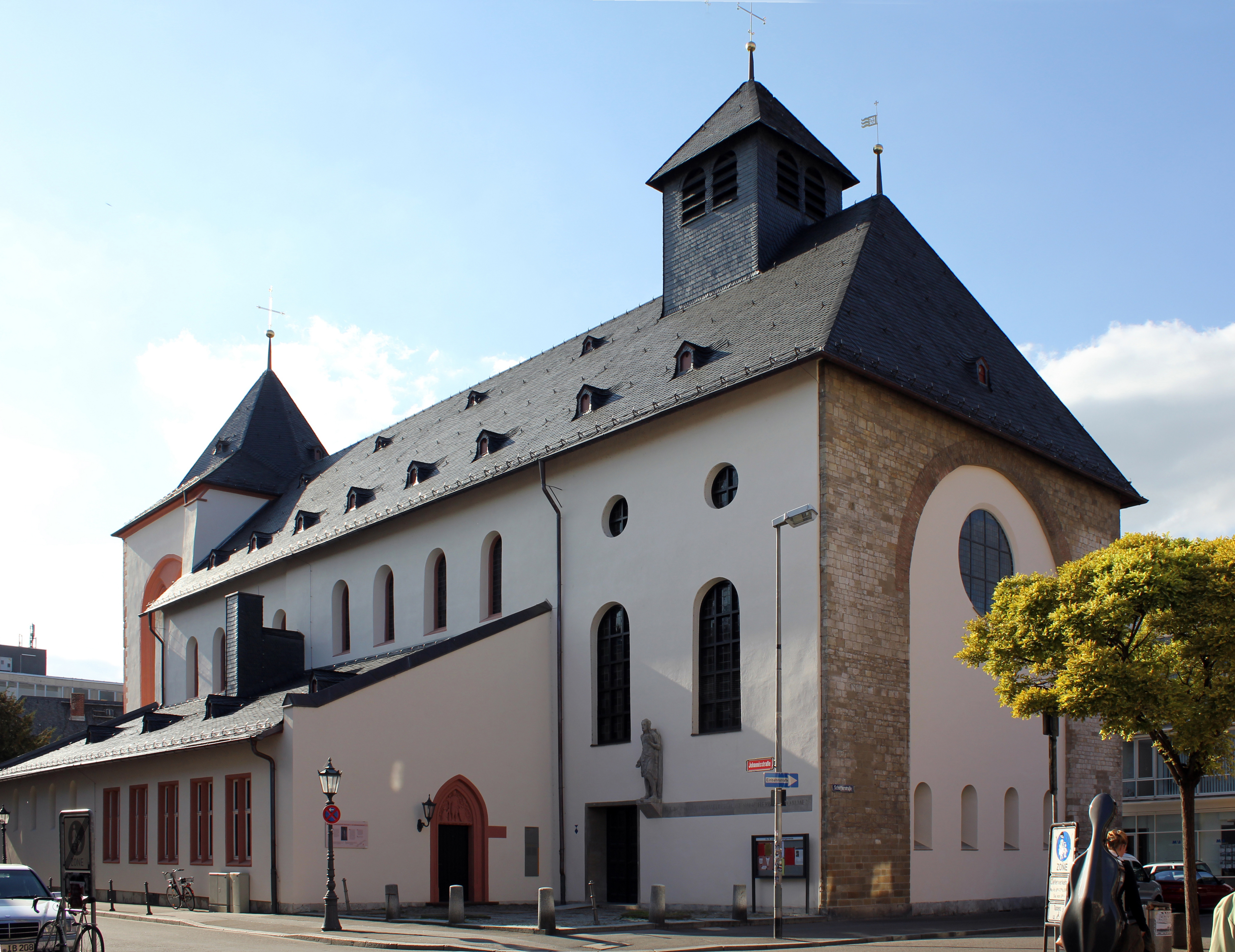
St John's Church, Mainz

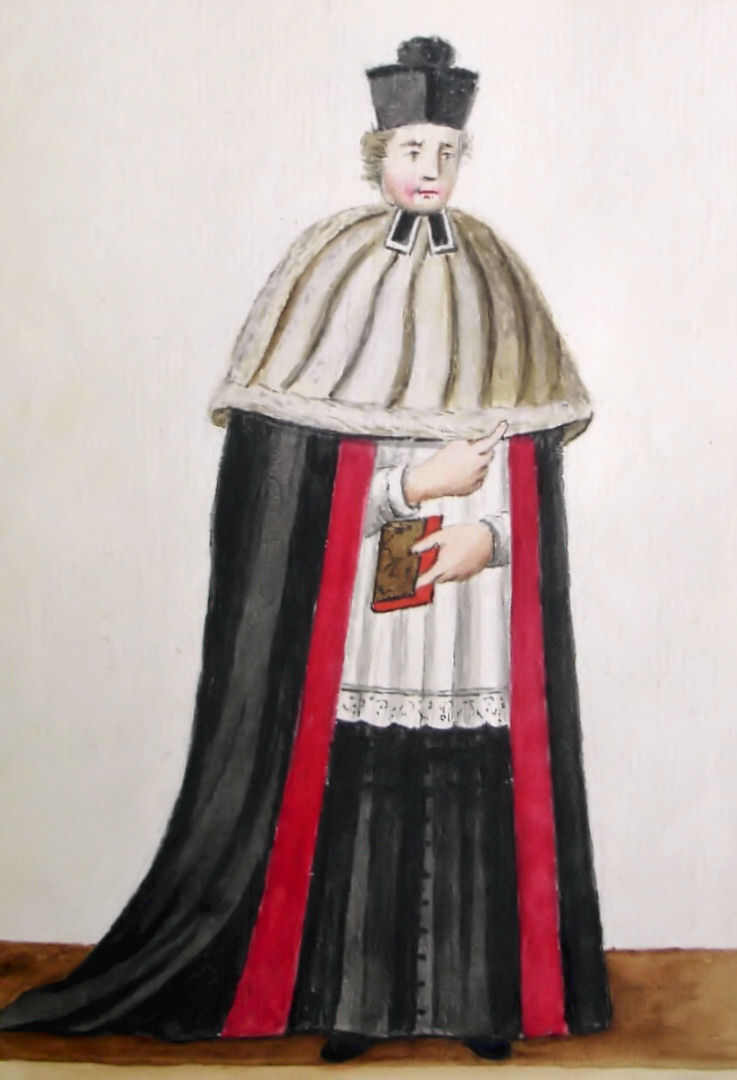
Canon's habit with biretta (Wilhelm was a secular canon before becoming bishop).

== Episcopate ==
=== Election and consecration ===
On 9 October 1505 he was unanimously elected by the capitulary canons after the preaching of Jean Geiler. The election was confirmed by Pope Julius II on 4 December 1506, despite his only being a subdeacon at the time. By then he was Lord of Lohra and Klettenburg.

He was ordained a priest in Saverne on 28 February 1507 and consecrated bishop on the fourth Sunday of Lent in the choir of Strasbourg Cathedral by Ernest, archbishop of Magdeburg, Duke of Saxony and primate of Germany, assisted by Konrad Wickram, titular bishop of Speyer, and Johann Ortwin, titular bishop of Strasbourg. Maximilian I's twentieth stay in Strasbourg lasted from 1492 to 1511 and so he also assisted at the consecration ceremony, since he was then in residence at the Knights Hospitaller convent in the city. Two days later Maximilian invested Wilhelm as a Prince of the Empire in Haguenau.

=== Entry into Strasbourg ===
He made his solemn entry into Strasbourg on Monday 4 October 1507. It is described in Bischoff Wilhelms von Hoehnsteins waal und einrit, attributed to the humanist scholar Sébastien Brant. Brant was then acting as chancellor of the city of Strasbourg and wrote one of Europe's first best-sellers, The Ship of Fools. His coronation in Strasbourg was an exception, since these traditionally new Bishops of Strasbourg were consecrated at Mainz Cathedral by the metropolitan bishop in Mainz, to whom the bishop of Strasbourg was a suffragan. There was a coronation and a solemn entry each time a new bishop was elected and for all but two bishops before Wilhelm (Henry II of Veringen in 1207 and Frederick of Lichtenberg, elected on 1 October 1299) these also occurred at Mainz Cathedral - it is still doubtful whether Gauthier of Geroldseck was crowned in Strasbourg.

==== Delegations and people in the procession ====
Four of Strasbourg's magistrates led by Othon Sturm met the bishop at the Saverne gate with forty knights. Frédéric Bock made a speech. The regular and secular clergy left the cathedral in procession and stopped at the Steinstraße bridge. The Place aux chevaux (now Place Broglie) was filled with 140 people. At 11 am cannon fire signalled Wilhelm's arrival.

648 knights followed Philippe of Hanau, grand marshal of the bishopric, who carried the bishop's flag. He was flanked by Reinhart, Count of Zweibrücken, lord of Bitche and the bishop's provost, who carried the landgrave's standards, and by count Wilhelm von Fürstenberg, representing his father Loup of Fürstenberg, who carried the standard of Hohnstein. Behind their horses was Philippe, margrave of Baden, and his son Christophe, then after them emissaries and diplomats:

- Delegation from the Holy Roman Emperor and King of the Romans
  - Freiherr Caspar de Mörsberg, bailiff of Lower-Alsace, representing the emperor;
- Delegation from the Archbishopric of Mainz
  - Comte Hamann von Henneberg, representing archbishop Jakob von Liebenstein;
- Delegation from the Palatinate of the Rhine
  - Freiherr Henri de Fleckenstein, emissary from Philip, Elector Palatine;
  - Jacques de Fleckenstein, former bailiff;
- Delegation from the Duchy of Lorraine
  - Henri, count of Salm, representing René II of Lorraine;
  - count Hessen of Linange;
  - Sire Jacques of Haraucourt, grand bailiff of Nancy;
  - Adam II of Hunolstein, provost;
  - Bastien of Rathsamhausen;
  - Philippe, Lord of Hérange, knight;
  - Pierre of Dalheim;
  - Lord of Huntlingen;
  - Bernard of Sarrebruck;
  - Jean Quinckner of Sarrebourg;
  - Nicolas Glock;

- Delegation from the Duchy of Wurtemberg
1. Sigmund, Freiherr of Fleckenstein, representing Ulrich, Duke of Württemberg;
2. Philippe, Margrave of Baden;
3. Léon, Freiherr of Staufen;
4. Blicker Landtschad, bailiff;
5. Dr. Jean Awer, provost of Baden-Baden;
6. Dr. Jacques Kürser, chancellor;
7. Conrad of Nippenberg;
8. Martin of Remichen;
9. Jörg of Bach;
10. Conrad of Veningen;
11. Pierre of Tale;
12. Arnold of Horneck;
13. Jean of Zulichart;
14. Jacques, Count of Stauffenberg;
15. Philippe of Hagenbuch

The bishop then arrived in his black cloak, the habit of choir canons, and his biretta. Around him were:

1. Burckhardt Beger, Lord of Geispolsheim, vidame to the bishop;
2. Antoine of Wilsberg;
3. Jean Sigirist, chancellor to the bishopric;
4. Louis, Lord of Rhinach, knight, provost of Rouffach;
5. Bernard, Lord of Uttenheim, knight;
6. Ulrich II of Rathsamhausen de la Roche;
7. Jacques of Landsberg;
8. Jacques of Königsbach, known as Nagell;
9. Samson of Rathsamhausen de la Roche;
10. Frédéric of La Petite-Pierre;
11. Loup of Landsberg;
12. Jean of Landsberg;
13. Jean of Mittelhausen, mayor of Saverne;
14. Jacques Wormser the Younger;
15. Rodolphe Diedenhammer;
16. Jean of Rudigheim;
17. Count Philippe Nagel;
18. Hammann Böcklin;
19. Jörg of Rathsamhausen de la Roche;
20. Guillaume Hess, assistant mayor of Saverne

The end of the procession was three hundred knights (Note: Other counts, lords, knights and squires in the procession: 1. Georges of Zweibrucken, lord of Bitche and of Ochsenstein; 2. Louis, count of Hanau; 3. Guillaume, lord of Ribeaupierre; 4. Hamman von Thun, lord of Obernstein; 5. Loup le Jeune, lord of Rippoltskirch; 6. Gangloff, lord of the Grand-Geroldseck; 7. Jean Heketzer, master of the Knights Hospitaller; 8. Hartung of Andlau, knight; 9. Jacques Beger of Bleyberg, knight; 10. Jean-Jacques of Bergheim, knight; 11. Georges Max of Eckbersheim, knight; 12. Jean of Hattstatt, knight; 13. Maurice Jung Zorn, knight; 14. Rodolphe of Blumeneck, knight; 15. Jean of Schönau; 16. Jean of House; 17. Claus of Schauenburg; 18. Arnould of Andlau; 19. Loup of Andlau; 20. Nicolas of Fleckstein; 21. Henri of Fleckstein; 22. Urbain of Hattstatt; 23. Georges of Hattstatt; 24. Jean Oswald of Hattstatt; 25. Claus Zorn of Bulach; 26. Étienne Mollenkopf zum Ruß; 27. Rodolphe of Zeisigheim; 28. Conrad of Wallstein; 29. Georges of Entzberg; 30. Louis of Thann; 31. Frédéric of Wilsberg; 32. Jacques Wetzel of Marsilien; 33. Philippe Wetzel of Marsilien; 34. Georges of Hohenstein; 35. Georges of Landsberg; 36. Jean of Wangen; 37. Frédéric of Schauenberg; 38. Jacques Quinckner of Sarrebourg; 39. Henri of Utenheim; 40. Antoine of Ramstein; 41. Albert of Rathsamhausen de la Roche; 42. Blaise of Mülnheim; 43. Jacques Bliecker of Rothenburg; 44. Paul Steer; 45. Jacques Waldener (Valdenaire); 46. Albert of Regesheim; 47. Georges Haffner of Wasselonne; 48. Hugues of Berstetten; 49. Georges of Wickersheim; 50. Martzolff of Weythersheim; 51. Caspar Zuckmantel; 52. Philippe Ritter of Haguenau; 53. Jean Krantz of Geispolsheim; 54. Jean of Neuenstein; 55. N. of Westhouse; 56. Jacques zur Megd; 57. Adolphe of Mittlehausen; 58. Jacques of Fegersheim; 59. Jacques of Oberkirch; 60. Philippe of Rosenburg; 61. Claus Böcklin; 62. Balthasar of Falkenstein; 63. Christophe Fürstenberger, provost of Achern; 64. Loup Eckbrecht of Turckheim; 65. Hertwig Eckbrecht of Turckheim; 66. Winkenthaler; 67. Henri of Thann; 68. Caspar of Wantzenheim; 69. Loup Wormser; 70. Simon Bastardt of Bitche; 71. Jean of Rambourg; 72. Balthasar of Endingen; 73. Jean Stumpf of Simmeringen; 74. Alexis of Beyern; 75. Georges of Soultz; 76. Caspar of Egersheim; 77. Loup of Rhinach; 78. Jacques of Rabenstein; 79. Vith Wycker, 'grand fou' to the king; 80. Vith of Ast; 81. Germain Veßler of Arnsberg; 82. N. of Buches)

On entering the cathedral, the new bishop took off his canon's habit and - accompanied by the dean and the schoolmaster - went to the throne, where he was presented with his episcopal insignia.

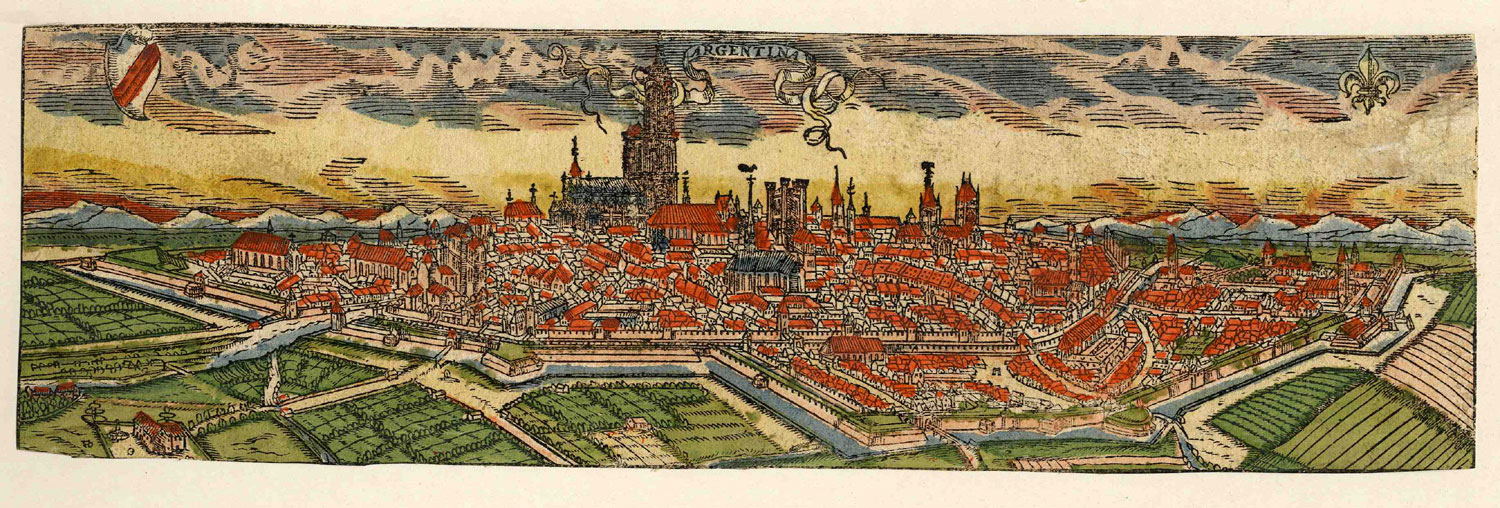
Engraving of 16th century Strasbourg au 16th century, « W.D. Klebeband Städtebilder »

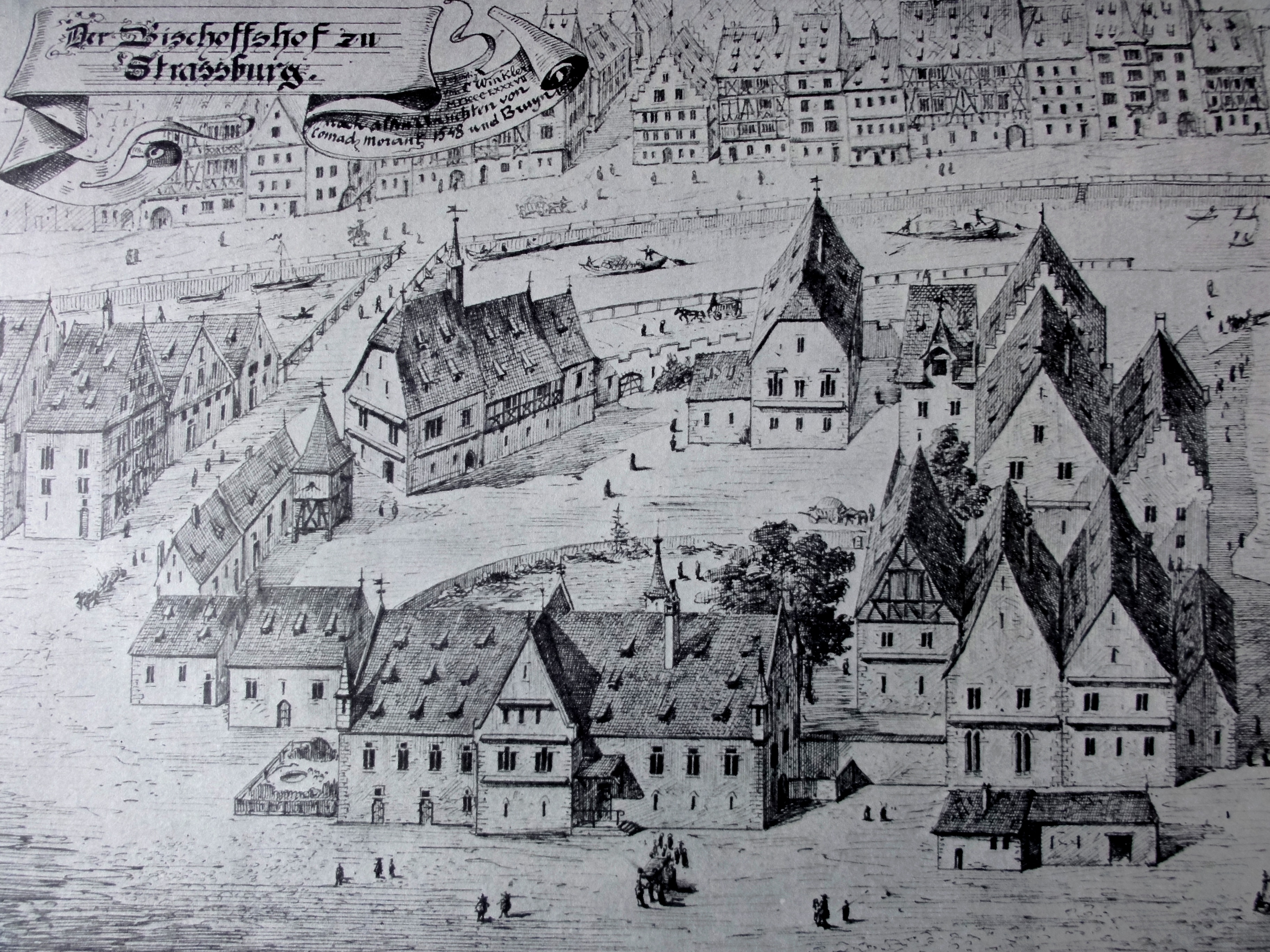
Episcopal palace in Strasbourg in 1548

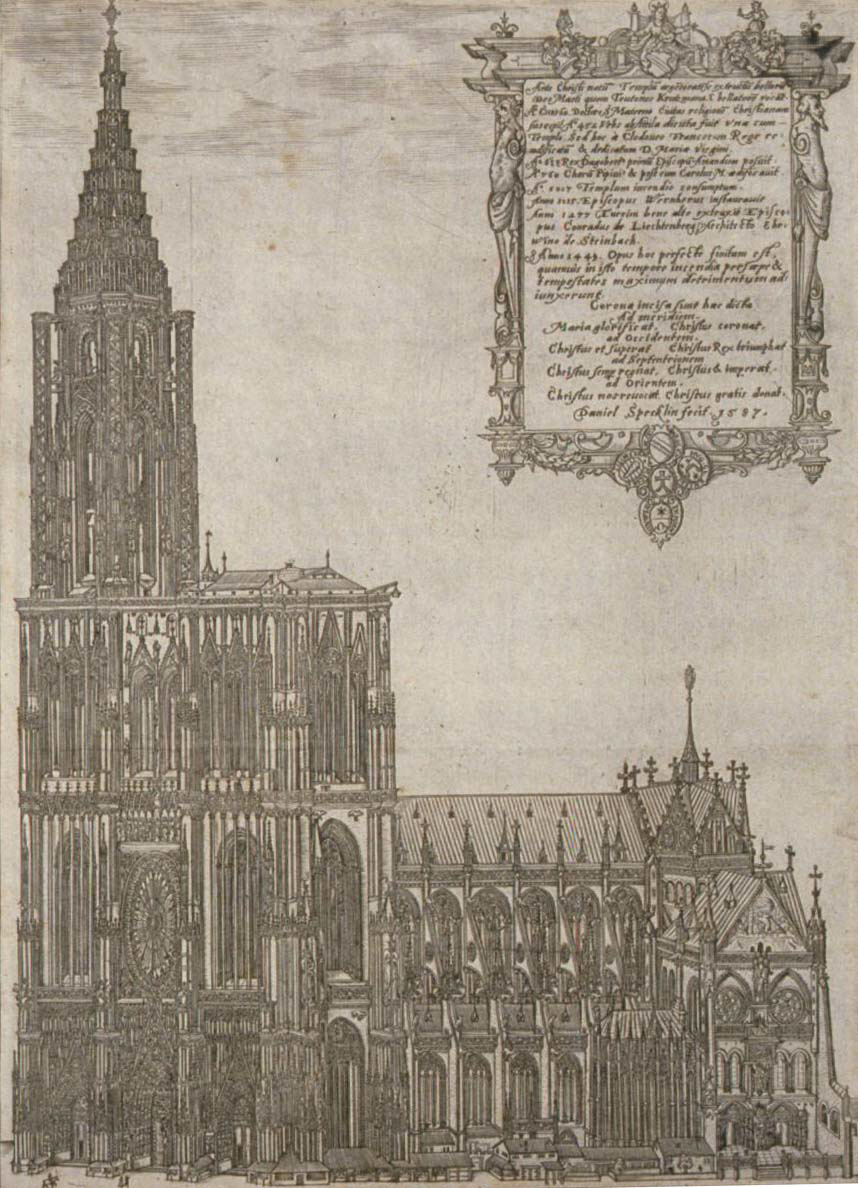
Templum Argentoratense by D. Specklin

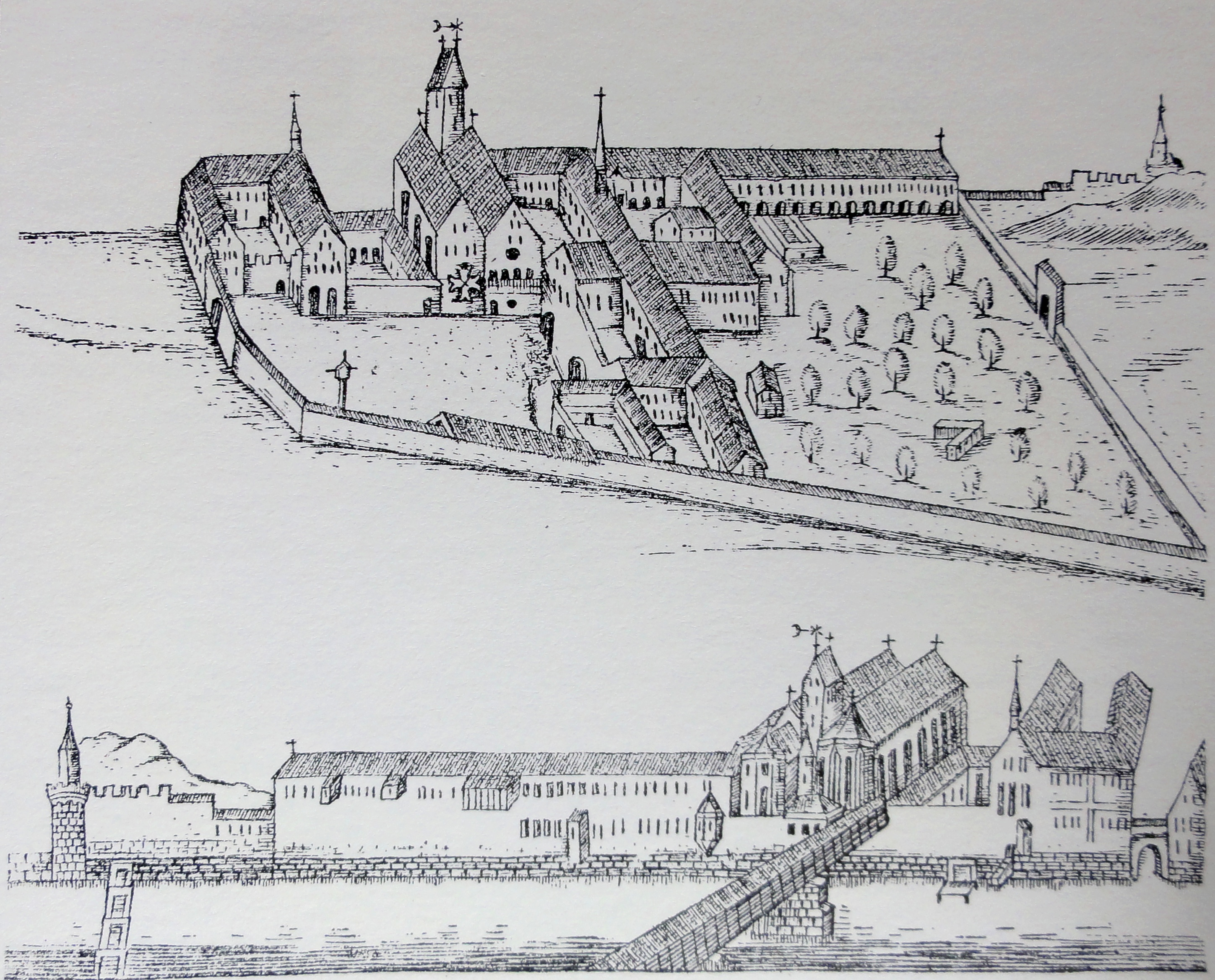
The Strasbourg Commandery, the emperor's home in 1507

=== Troubles ===
==== Reformation ====
For twenty years the situation deteriorated both for the Catholic middle classes in Strasbourg and for the canons and secular clergy of the bishopric. Many intellectuals (particularly the cathedral's and the collegiate churches' preaching priests) favoured the reformers. This was still not an open confessional schism, but a strong expectation that the Holy See would carry out deep reform to root out what most saw as abuse of the Catholic hierarchy.

On 20 January 1524 the episcopal curia summoned married priests to appear at Saverne, but - as they refused to comply by acknowledging their marriages as illegal and agreeing to their annulment - the bishop asked the city magistrate to expel them for breaking their priestly vows and provoking the people's anger. The magistrate refused to do so and kept these heretical priests in their roles - he could afford to do so because some of the city's high clergy (such as Sigismond von Hohenlohe, dean of the chapter, and Wolfgang Capiton, provost of the collegiate church of St Thomas) were protecting and favouring the new religion based on their reading of the gospels and the bishop seemed to be unaware that the inhabitants of Strasbourg was rather welcoming to the evolution of religious practices in their city.

On 14 March 1524 the bishop declared the excommunication of married priests, thus turning them out of the Catholic faith. In response they gathered in the home of Matthieu Zell, cathedral preacher, who had married gardener's daughter Catherine Schütz. There they drafted a request for an appeal to be considered at the next church council, entitled "request for an appeal from the married priests of the city of Strasbourg against their infamous and calumnious excommunication by the bishop". They displayed this appeal on the cathedral door on 5 April 1524. Rather than stopping the phenomenon of married priests, Wilhelm accelerated it - the Augustinian monk Wolfgang Schultheiss married and left for Schiltigheim to introduce reform there. Conrad Spatzinger, vicar of the cathedral chapter, also married, as did Alexandre de Villingen, a templar of the Knights Hospitaller, Johannes Riebling, a priest of the Saint-Erhard chapel, Lucas Hackfurt, chaplain of Obernai, Symphorien Pollio, cathedral preacher and priest at the collegiate church of Saint-Étienne, and Caspar Hedio, famous cathedral preacher and friend of Erasmus.

Faced with a major revolt by protesting clergy who felt entirely within their rights to oppose what Wilhelm saw as the church's fundamental principles, his only available solution was to register his opposition and make an official complaint to the imperial diet in Nuremberg via an emissary, the Alsatian Franciscan monk and theologian Dr Thomas Murner. cardinal Alessandro Campeggio took up the case and summoned the free city's two representatives, Daniel Mueg and Bernard Wurmser, to the diet. There he asked for an explanation but they both seem to have defended themselves well, since their summoning marked a failure for the Catholic faction. Mueg and Wurmser only had to pass on the papal legate's remonstrances.

Encouraged by this relative weakness among the major Catholic clergy, Strasbourg's magistrate did not hesitate to take church and religious matters in the city into his own hands. This included appointing priests and preachers - he appointed Hedio and Zell to the cathedral, Antoine Firn to the chapter of St Thomas, Martin Bucer to Saint-Aurélien, Capiton to Saint-Pierre-le-Jeune, Théobald Schwarz (known as Nigring) to Saint-Pierre-le-Vieux, Barthélemy Latomus to Saint-Nicolas, Pollio to Saint-Martin and Martin Hag to Ruprechtsau. The period between 1526 and 1547 was splendid and fruitful for the reformers in Strasbourg.

Those living in Strasbourg who remained faithful to the Catholic faith resisted by organising around the Augustinian provincial Konrad Treger and the Franciscan theologian Thomas Murner. However, Treger and several conservative monks and priests were imprisoned at the magistrate's request for infringing the liberty of conscience and faith. Treger gave up on Strasbourg and took refuge in Fribourg, Switzerland. The reformers wrote more and more tracts, which were spread by the long-established printers and editors based in Strasbourg. There were still some opponents of Protestantism among the city's intellectuals and high office holders, such as Gérôme Gebwiler (director of the Latin school of the cathedral's main chapter), lawyers Wendelin and Friess, and the theologian Murner.

On 6 January 1525 twenty-five canons of the collegiate churches of Saint-Thomas, Saint-Pierre-le-Jeune and Saint-Pierre-le-Vieux wrote a document declaring their provisional obligation to flee to Haguenau and Offenbourg without any question of renouncing their prebendaries and their place on the chapter, before having it witnessed before a notary at Molsheim. By this exile they protected their goods and their safety. Wurmser, dean of Saint-Thomas, edited this document. Towards the end of 1525, Strasbourg's magistrate only authorised four masses according to the Catholic rite, one each in the cathedral, Saint-Thomas, Saint-Pierre-le-Jeune and Saint-Pierre-le-Vieux.

From his residence forty kilometres from Strasbourg, the bishop had to support this inexorable advance of Protestantism in his diocese: Catholic symbols and ornaments held to be too ostentatious were removed from the cathedral, the Holy Week ceremonies were banned and in 1529 the city's aldermen decreed the suppression of the Catholic mass.

The novice sisters at the convent of Sainte-Madeleine suffered for their resistance to the incessant appeals from preachers and reformers such as Herlin and Zell to marry and cease confessing to Louis Dietmar, prior of Saint-Guillaume. Between 1549 and 1559 there was a brief respite for the Catholic inhabitants of Strasbourg, although Alsace hung onto most of its Protestant gains. However, obeying Wilhelm's command, the Magistrate of Strasbourg secularised the convent of Sainte-Madeleine, despite intervention by emperor Rudolph II and the cameral tribunal of Speyer - Louis XIV's wife symbolically returned it to the sisters as a reward for their endurance and tenacity during her husband's siege of the city in 1681. In 1532 Wilhelm declined the Holy See's offer to become coadjutor bishop of Mainz.

Finally the inhabitants of Strasbourg found a middle way between the doctrines of Martin Luther and those of Zwingli - they did not adopt the Augsburg Confession but was one of the four settlements to adopt the Tetrapolitan Confession in 1534. They did not completely renounce the discipline of church life, but over time the magistrate leant towards a 'Strasbourgian church' organised and structured by a pastoral counsel and by three members of the magistracy known as Kirchenpfleger, charged with debating and resolving all questions of ministry and doctrine.

==== Peasants' War ====
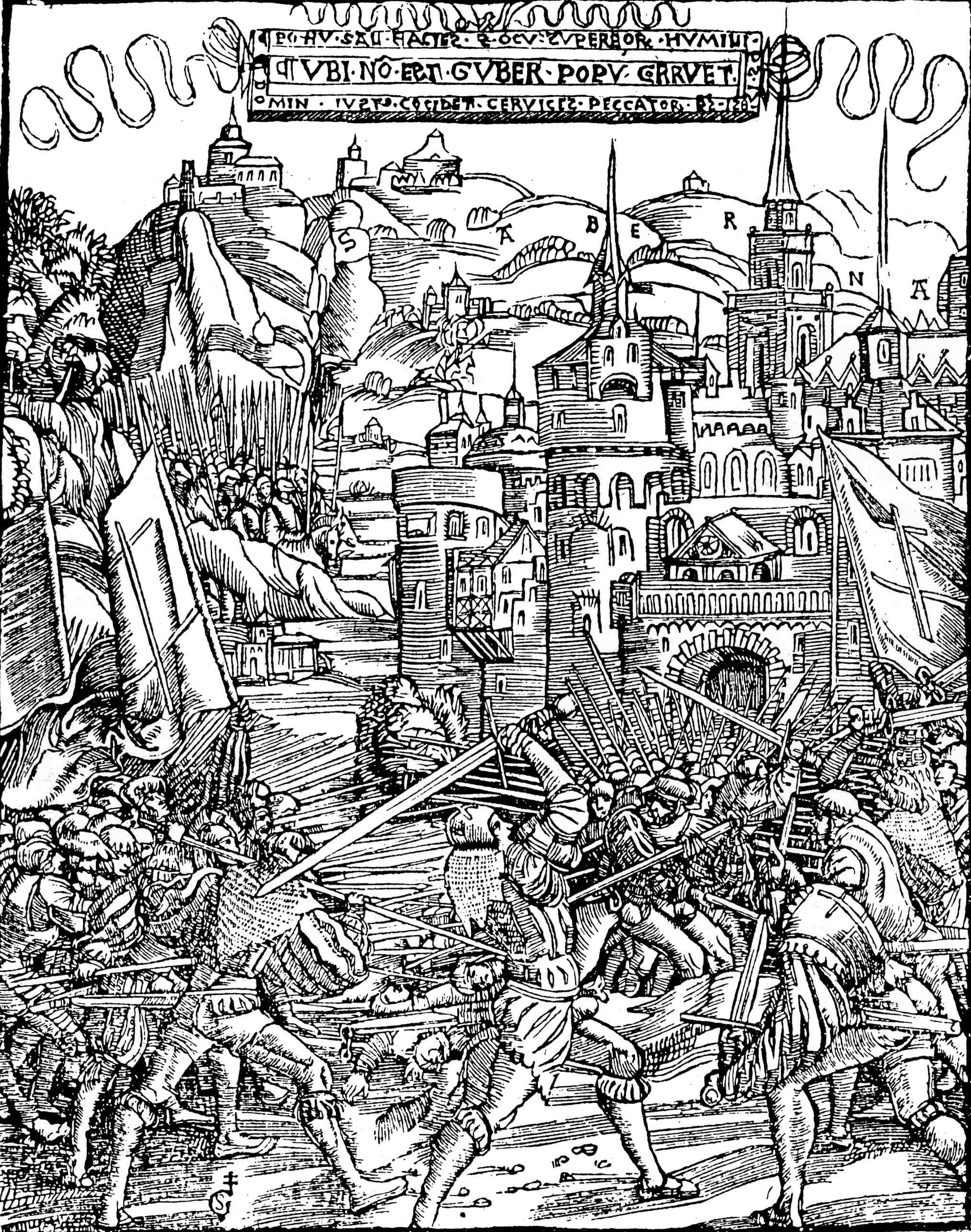
The battle at Saverne (engraving by Gabriel Salmon for the book by Nicolas Volcyr de Serrouville, 1526)

In 1525 the German Peasants' War spilled over into Alsace and Lorraine) and led to large loss of life particularly in the lands of the bishopric of Strasbourg and the bishop's main residence at Saverne, where Wilhelm later died. His counsellors were away in Aschaffenburg at the court of his episcopal superior the archbishop of Mainz, but even so they requested help from Antoine, Duke of Lorraine. He arrived in Sarrebourg on 15 May and set up his general headquarters in Steinbourg after his attempted offensive was stopped by peasant bands blocking the Saverne Pass in mid May. His repression was bloody as he had difficulty controlling his landsknechts.

Antoine tried to plot a middle course between Charles V and Francis I of France - he was unable to avoid taking part in the fight against the peasants but avoided the larger battles. He also assisted at a mass in Marmoutier Abbey after it was liberated and hunted down the peasant forces which had escaped the massacre at Saverne and fled towards Molsheim, Scherwiller and Châtenois

During this war the episcopal administration took refuge in Dachstein, a former episcopal residence first occupied when the bishops had to leave Strasbourg in the 13th century. Wilhelm announced a general amnesty for leaders of peasant bands when they were judged before an extraordinary tribunal on 'invocavit' Sunday in 1526.

==== Internal Protestant conflicts ====
From 7 to 26 January 1528 the reformers gathered at Bern in Switzerland, with Bucer and Capitan of Strasbourg assisting. There they signed ten theses, of which the sixth declared that the eucharist was contrary to holy scripture and an insult to Christ's sacrifice on the cross. Wilhelm had already often threatened Strasbourg's magistracy that he could not longer support the reforms that had been undertaken. In 1528 he asked Balthazar von Merkel, bishop of Hildesheim and the emperor's vice-chancellor, then passing through Strasbourg, to exhort the Senate to go no further until the next church council had taken its decisions. This was to no avail and so Wilhelm asked the cameral tribunal of Speyer to notify the inhabitants of Strasbourg on Christmas Eve 1528 that they had provoked the anger of the emperor and archduke Ferdinand and would be ill-advised to go further with reform until the next church council had been held.

On 20 February 1529 the Senate sat with 279 of the 320 aldermen. One of the items for discussion was a vote on whether to suppress or continue mass according to the Catholic rite. 94 backed a temporary solution until the next imperial diet, one to keep the Catholic-rite mass, and 184 to suppress it. The council therefore made holding the Catholic-rite punishable by death within the city walls and in all its dependencies, namely Schiltigheim, Niederhausbergen, Illkirch-Grafenstaden, Ostwald, Ittenheim, Handschuhheim, Dorlisheim, Wasselonne, Wangen, Eckbolsheim, Dettwiller and Dossenheim. The ban later extended to Barr, Mittelbergheim, Heiligenstein, Gertweiler, Goxwiller and Bergheim when Strasbourg acquired them in 1566. Following this ban the prebendary canons scattered in all directions - some moved to Saverne, became parish priests or left Alsace, but the majority returned to Strasbourg when the ban was lifted on 1 February 1550.

Wilhelm was unable to stop the decline of Catholicism in his territories and the neighbouring lordships throughout Baden and Alsace which fell in his diocese. Among Strasbourg's nine churches, twenty monasteries and 180 chapels the churches of Saint-Martin, Saint-André and Sainte-Hélène and the chapels of Saint-Marc and Saint-Vith were demolished. The church of Saint-Étienne closed in 1533, that of Saint-Michel converted into a salt store in 1534 and the Dominican monastery into a college in 1538. When Georges Eibel, provost of Saint-Arbogast, die on 16 December 1530 the magistrate demolished that monastery and confiscated its goods and lands.

Wilhelm had to oppose both Lutheran and Calvinist doctrines after Strasbourg gave refuge to Jean Calvin in 1538. The city gave Calvin the rights and liberties of the city on 29 July 1539 and it was there he married Anabaptist Jean Storder's widow Idelette de Bure and began preaching to French and French-speaking Protestants, initially at Saint Nicholas Church, then in the nave of the church of Sainte-Madeleine and finally in the new church.

Anabaptist doctrines were also welcomed into Strasbourg, so much so that for at one point the Lutheran majority within the magistracy felt threatened by them and expelled their preachers, after having organised a debate in 1527. At the request of rector Jacques Sturm, on 29 June 1527 the senate placed heavy sanctions on anabaptists who decided to remain in the city. These Anabaptists included Hetzer, Denk, Hoffmann, Reublin and Salzmann, whilst Caspar Schwenckfeld von Ossig was also welcomed and lodged by Capiton and Zell in 1529 after he was forced into exile, hunted out of his homeland of Silesia. His increasing influence worried Bucer and so von Schwenckfeld had to leave Strasbourg in 1534 and move to Ulm.
