= Hans Hammer (disambiguation) =

Hans Hammer (born 1440 or 1445; died 1519) was a German stonemason, master builder and architect

Hans Hammer may also refer to:

- Hans Jørgen Hammer (1815–1882), Danish artist
- Hans von Hammer, lead character in comic series Enemy Ace
- Hans Hammer (politician), Austrian politician, mayor of Lafnitz

== See also ==
- Hans Hammergafferstein, pseudonym of poet Henry Wadsworth Longfellow (1807–1882)
