= Rupert of Palatinate-Simmern =

Rupert of Palatinate-Simmern may refer to:

- Rupert of Palatinate-Simmern (bishop of Strasbourg) (1420–1478), German nobleman and bishop
- Rupert of Palatinate-Simmern (bishop of Regensburg) (1461–1507), German nobleman and bishop
