= Lanzelin of Klettgau =

10th century Germanic noble

Lanzelin of Altenburg, Count of Klettgau
- Duke of Altenburg, Duke of Muri, Count of Klettgau, Count of Sungdau
- Born: c. 940 AD
- Died: 981 or 991 AD
- Noble family: Etichonids
- Issue: Landolt II; Werner; Radbot; Rudolf I
- Father: Guntram the Rich

Lanzelin (c. 940–981/991) was a Germanic noble and was a distant ancestor of the House of Habsburg. His father, Guntram the Rich, was a powerful nobleman. He married Liutgarda of Nellenburg (daughter of Eberhart III of Thurgau) from whom he inherited part of his possessions in present-day Switzerland, whilst from his father he inherited the titles of Duke of Muri and Count of Sundgau. He also possessed the titles of Duke of Altenburg (Brugg) and Count of Klettgau, and had lands in Alsace.

Several male children were born to him, amongst which are:

- Lanzelin II or Lanzelin the Younger († 1027), who was Count of Reichenau, as well as a possible predecessor of the House of Zähringen.
- Werner († 1028), Bishop of Strasbourg.
- Radbot († 1045), Count of Klettgau and builder of Habsburg Castle. He was the ancestor of what would become the House of Habsburg.
- Rudolf I († 1064), Count of Habsburg.

He also had a daughter, Ita von Habsburg.
