= Muri Abbey =

Benedictine monastery in Aargau, Switzerland

- Kloster Muri (German)
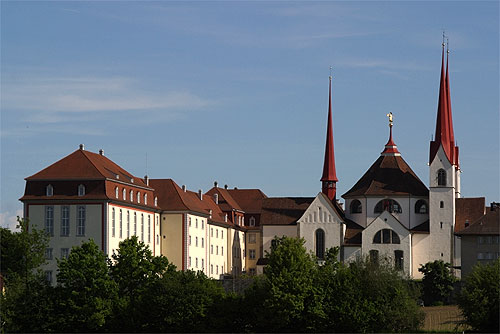
- Muri Abbey

- Location within Switzerland
- 47°16′35″N 08°20′23″E
- Location: Switzerland

History
- Built: 1064

Site notes
- Area: Europe
- Architectural styles: Gothic, Baroque

Muri Abbey (German: Kloster Muri) was a Benedictine monastery dedicated to Saint Martin of Tours. It flourished for over eight centuries at Muri, in the Canton of Aargau, near Zürich, Switzerland. While the monastery is currently established as Muri-Gries in South Tyrol, the former abbey is now a museum and heritage site of national significance.

== History ==
The monastery of Saint Martin of Tours at Muri in the Canton of Aargau, in the Diocese of Basel (but originally in that of Constance), was founded in 1027 by Radbot, Count of Habsburg, one of the progenitors of the House of Habsburg. Rha, a daughter of Frederick, Duke of Lower Lorraine, and Werner, Bishop of Strasburg, each donated a portion of land to a monastery which they established there. A colony of monks was drawn from the nearby Einsiedeln Abbey, under the leadership of Prior Reginbold. On his death in 1055, Burchard was chosen as the monastery's first abbot. During his rule the abbey church was consecrated in 1064.

About this time, the community was reinforced by the accession of a new colony of monks from the Abbey of St. Blaise in the Black Forest, one of whom, the Blessed Luitfrid, continued the government of both communities until his death 31 December 1096. The monastery pursued its quiet work of religion and civilization under the leadership of able abbots, the most remarkable of whom were

- Ranzelin
- Cuno, founder of a school and a generous benefactor to the library of the monastery
- Henry Scheuk who greatly increased its landed property
- Henry de Schoenwerd

Under Schoenwerd's rule, a whole family embraced the religious life. The father with his sons entered the abbey of the monks, whilst his wife and daughters betook themselves to the adjoining convent of nuns, a community which later on was transferred to Hermetschwil, around five miles distant from Muri. The good reputation enjoyed by the Abbey of Muri procured it many friends. In 1114, Emperor Henry V took it under his special protection; and the popes on their side were not less solicitous for its welfare. The abbey had extensive possessions or sharhoder rights in Unterwalden, in Stans, Buochs, and shielings in the mountains around Engelberg.

The abbey had its vicissitudes of good and bad fortune. It was laid low by two disastrous fires, in 1300 and in 1363; wars and uprisings checked for a time its prosperity. It recovered something of its old life under Abbot Conrad II, only to suffer again during the abbacy of his successor, George Russinger, in the war between the Swiss Confederacy and the Habsburgs.

Russinger, who had taken part in the Council of Constance (1414–1418), set out to reform the abbey and joined it to the newly formed Congregation of Bursfelde, a union of Benedictine monasteries, both of men and of women, founded in 1446 to promote the reform of Benedictine practice. Pope Julius II (1503–1513) granted the Abbots of Muri the use of pontificalia.

In the 1530s, the abbey was attacked by troops from Bern, a leading – and newly Protestant – member of the Swiss Confederacy. It survived thanks to Abbot Laurentius von Heidegg (1508–1540), who was friends with Heinrich Bullinger, the leading reformer of Zürich.

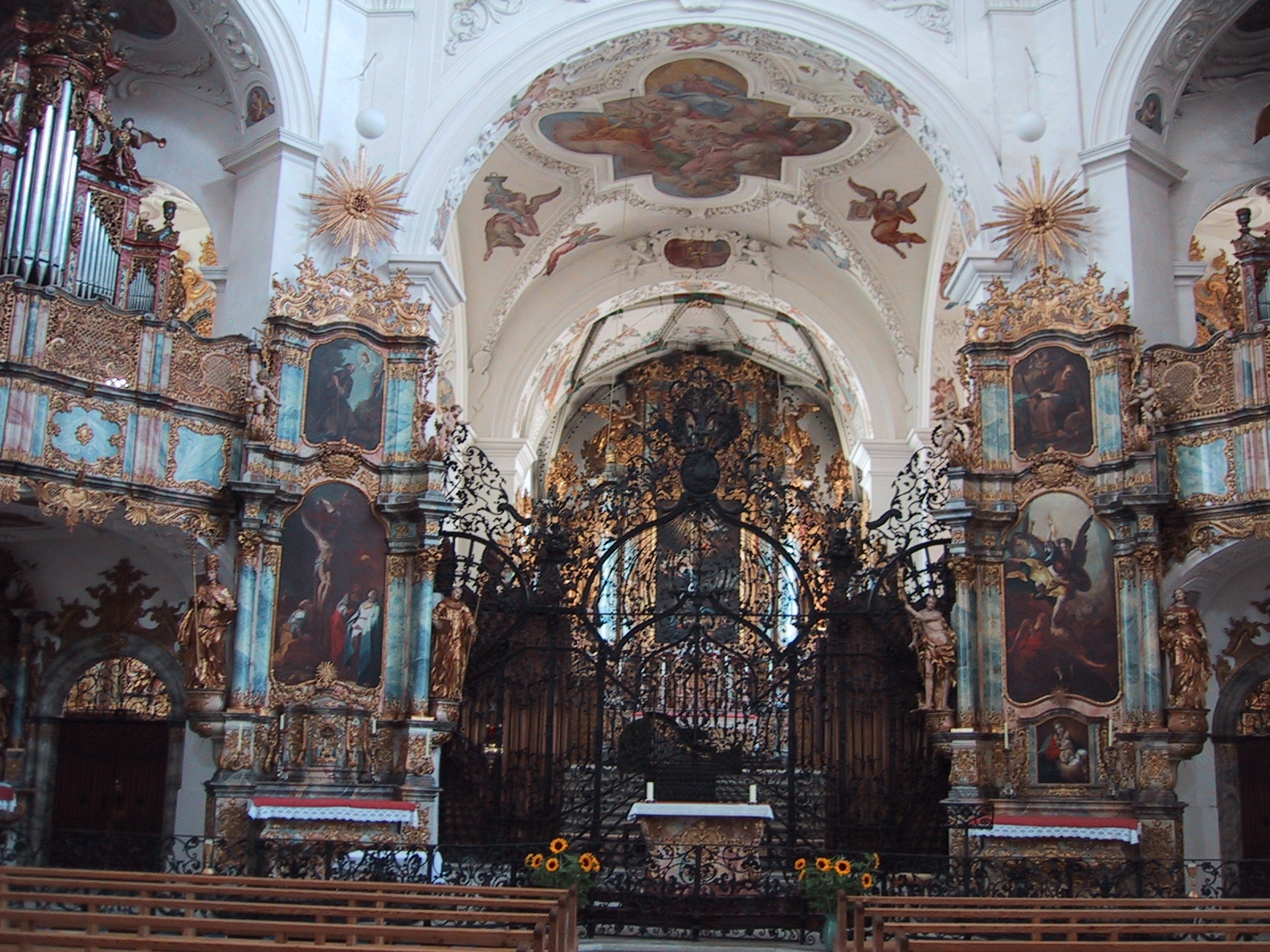
Interior church of Muri Abbey

The rule of Abbot Jakob Meyer, a member of a noble family from Lucerne, proved an economic disaster. Meyer was eventually forced out of office in 1596 and replaced by John Jodoc Singisen, who proved himself a second founder of his monastery, who extended his care to the other Benedictine houses of Switzerland and was one of the founders of the Swiss Congregation established in 1602. Largely through his efforts discipline was restored; monks of piety and letters went forth from Muri to re-people the half-full cloisters; by his wisdom suitable constitutions were drawn up for such communities of nuns as had survived so many revolutions. His successor, Dominic Tschudi, was a man of like mould, and a scholar whose works were held in great repute. He was born at Baden in 1595 and died there in 1654. His Origo et genealogia comitum de Habsburg is his best known work.

With the eighteenth century fresh honours came to Muri. The Emperor Leopold I raised Abbot Placid Zurlauben, and his successor, to the rank of princes of the Holy Roman Empire, and spent a vast sum of money in rebuilding and embellishing the monastery and church, the ancient mausoleum of the imperial family. The abbey continued to prosper in every way; good discipline was kept up and many distinguished ecclesiastics and learned men were educated within its walls.

With the spread of the French Revolution, the Canton of Aargau set out to drive out religious institutions. Muri, after a long resistance, was obliged to submit. Its abbot, an old man, had withdrawn to the monastery of Engelberg, more favourably situated, and there died on 5 November 1838, leaving his successor, D. Adalbert Regli, to deal with the situation after the canton closed the abbey in 1841. With their expulsion from Muri, the community relocated to the Canton of Unterwalden.

The abbey of Muri had been a favoured burial place of the House of Habsburg. The oldest burial place of the Habsburgs is in the Abbey church. In the twentieth century, the hearts of the last reigning Imperial couple, Karl I, Emperor of Austria (now the Blessed Charles of Austria, 1887–1922) and his consort Princess Zita of Bourbon-Parma (now a Servant of God, 1892–1989) are in the family crypt in the Loreto Chapel, as are the bodies of their sons Rudolf and Felix.

== Present day ==
The former abbey is now a museum and cultural center, featuring the work of Swiss landscape painter Caspar Wolf. The monastery museum houses valuable treasures of the monastery. It has been designated a heritage site of national significance.

== Gallery ==
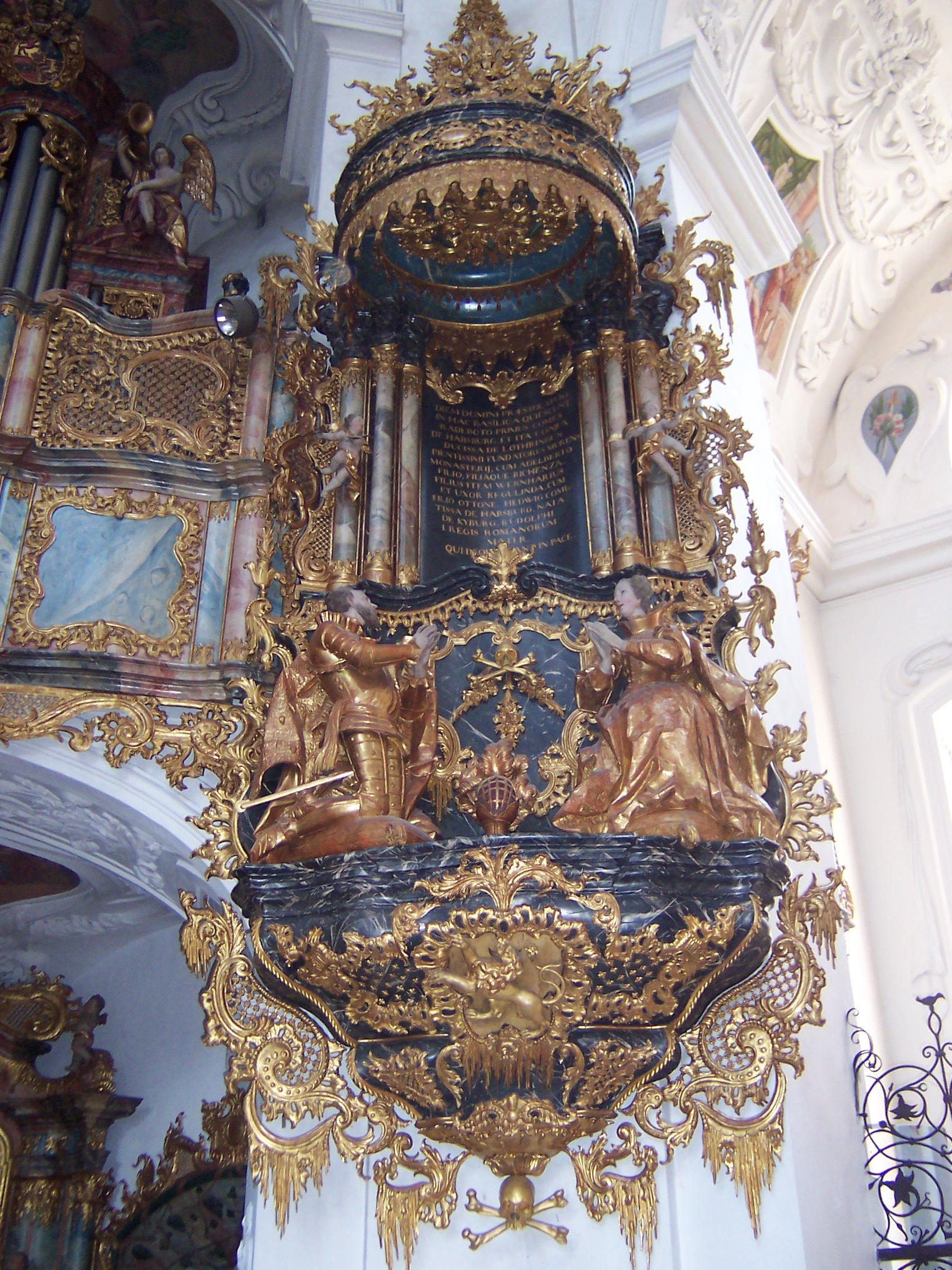
Pulpit

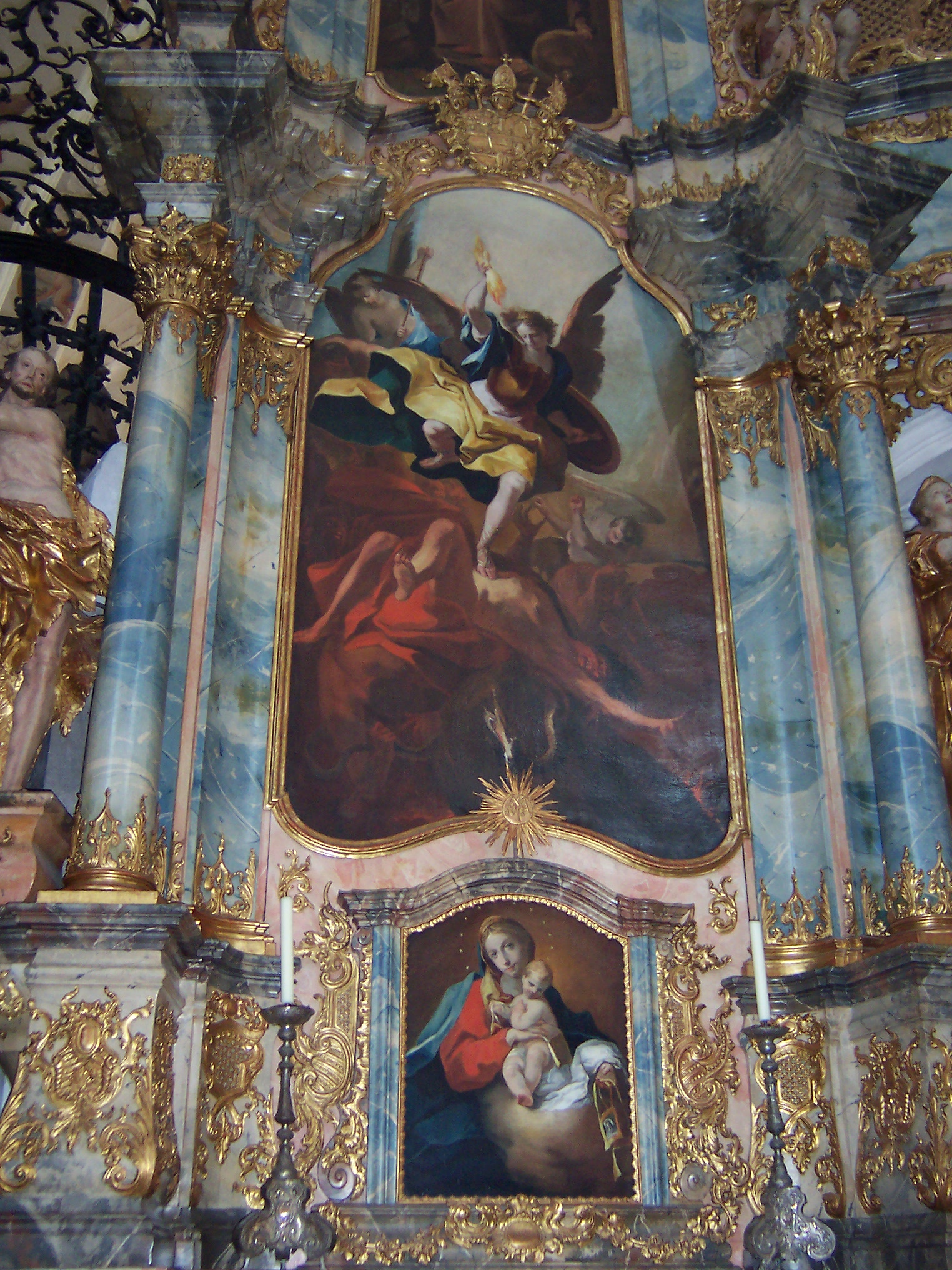
Saint Michael's Altar

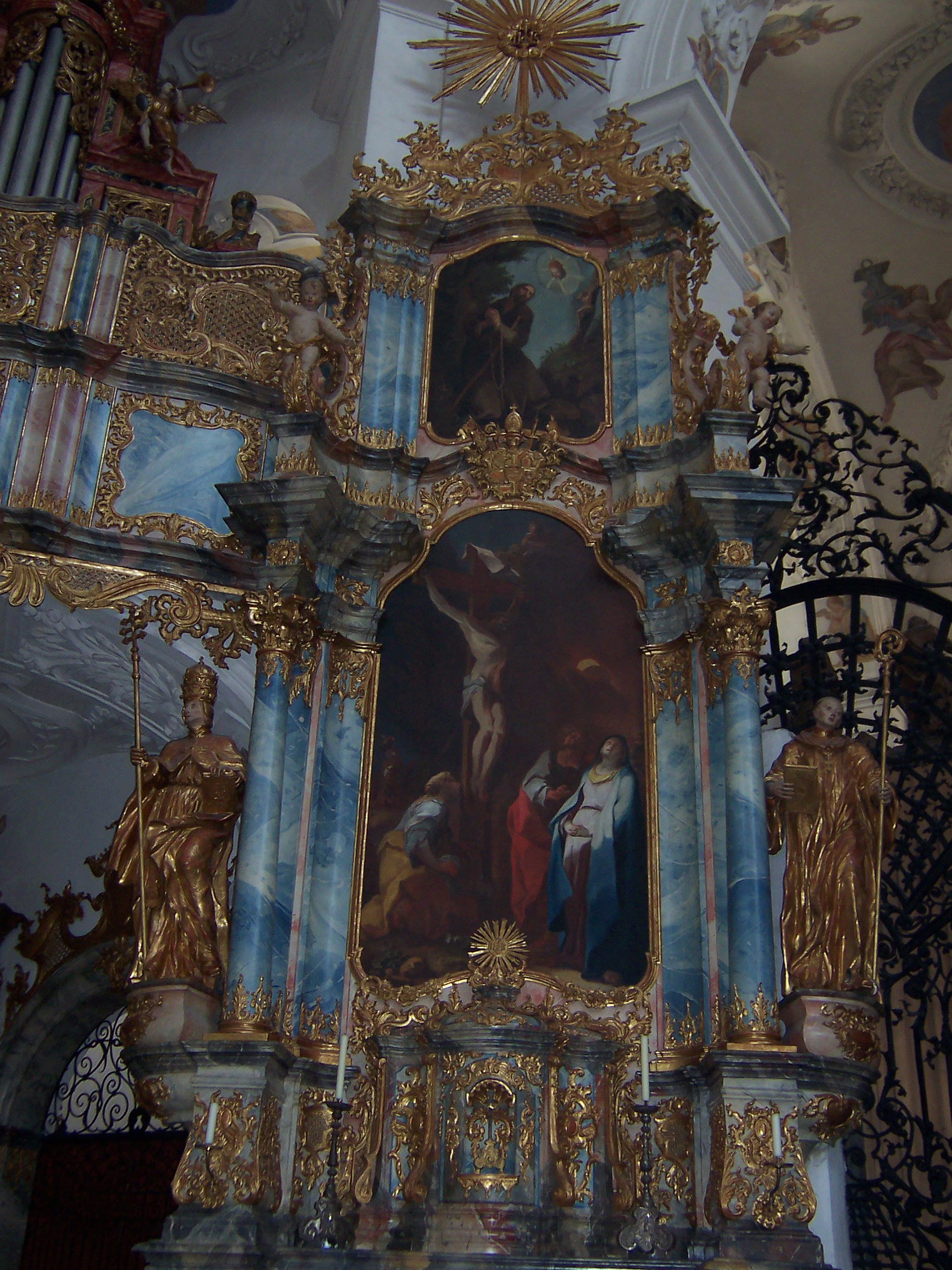
Holy Cross Altar

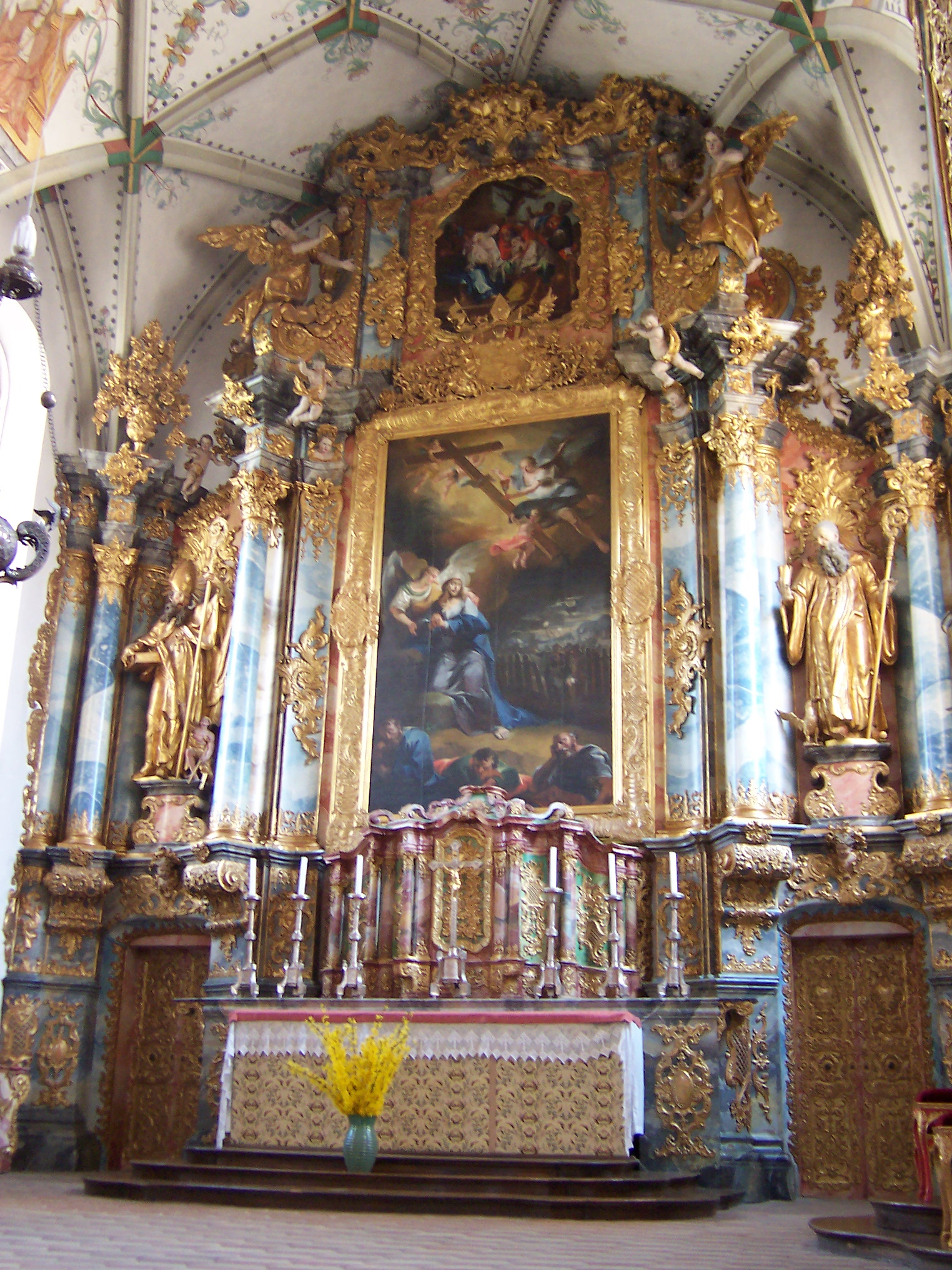
Choral Altar

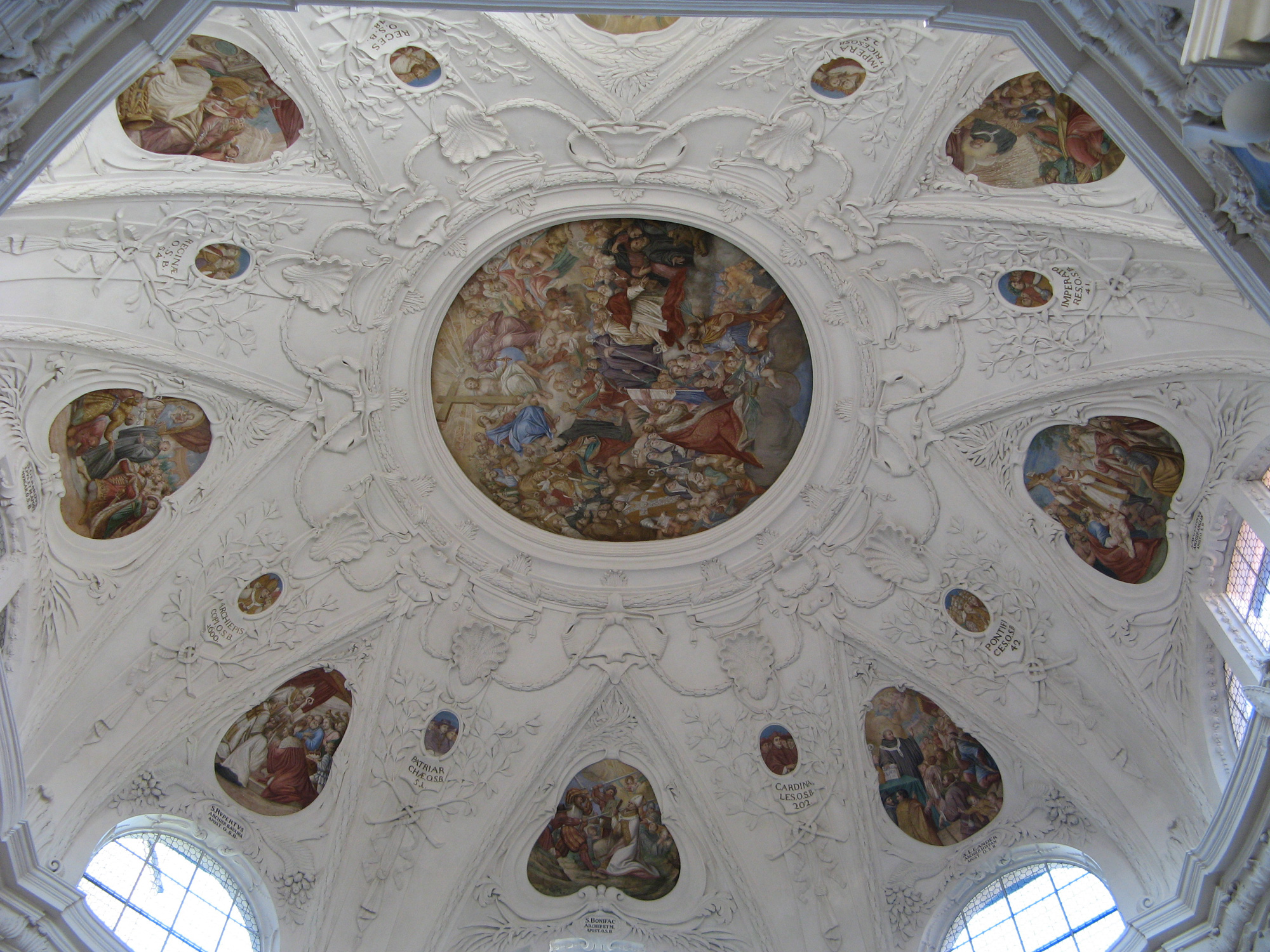
Cupola frescos

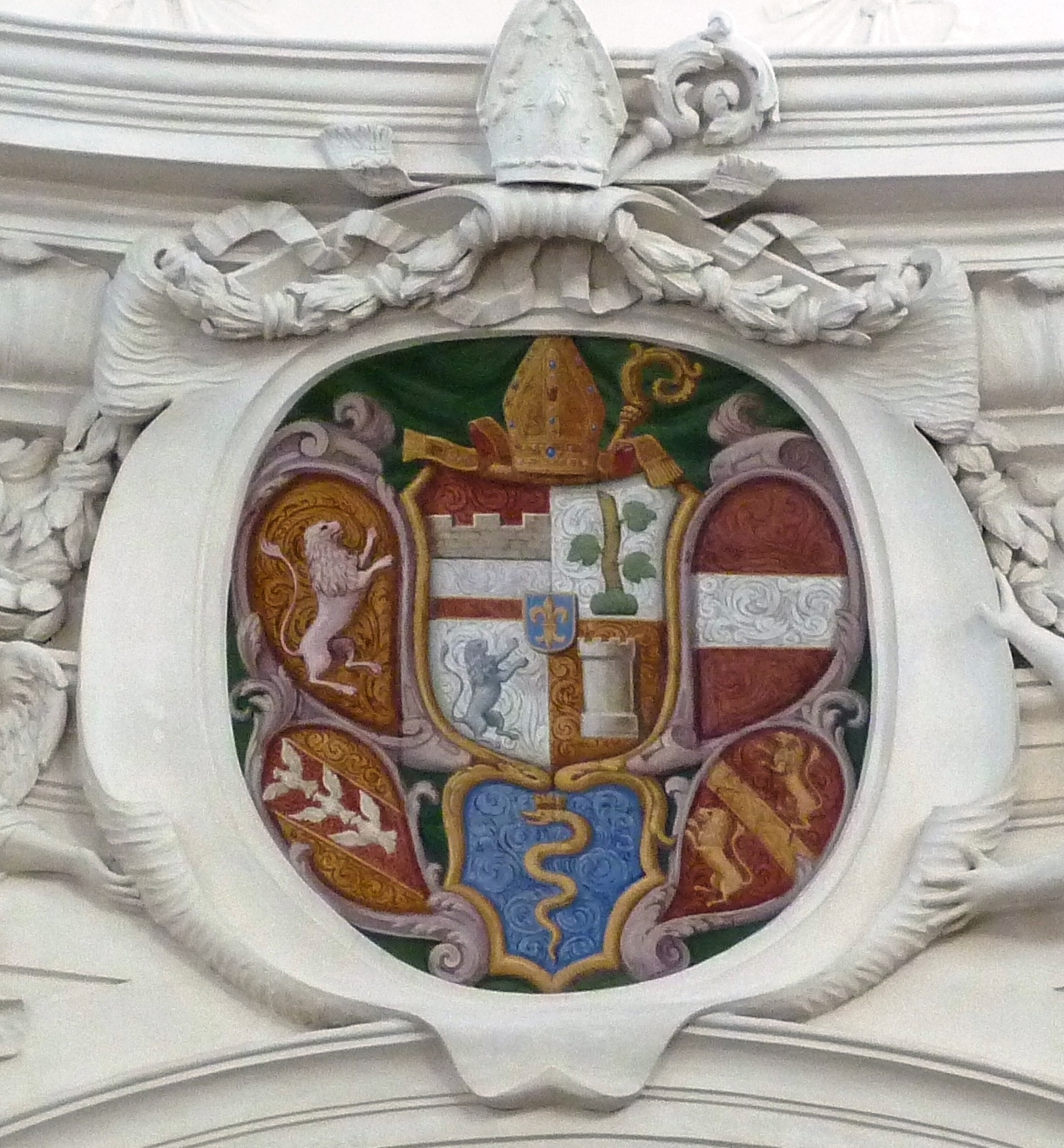
Coat of arms

== See also ==
- Muri-Gries Abbey
