= Amandus of Strasbourg =

Bishop

Amandus of Strasbourg (circa 290-355) was, about 346, the first Bishop of Strasbourg. His feast day is 26 October.
