= Rupert of Palatinate-Simmern (bishop of Strasbourg) =

Rupert of Palatinate-Simmern (1420 – 17 October 1478, in Saverne) was a Roman Catholic clergyman and member of the Palatinate-Simmern family. From 1440 to 1478 he was bishop of Strasbourg.

== Life ==
He was the second son of Stephen, Count Palatine of Simmern-Zweibrücken and was named after his father's father Rupert, King of Germany. From 1432 to 1436 he was a canon of the bishopric of Trier and in 1436 a canon in Mainz. In 1436 he became provost of St Guido's church in Speyer and then in 1437 a canon of the bishopric of Cologne. From 1438 to 1439 he studied at the university of Heidelberg and in 1440 he became a canon at Strasbourg Cathedral. Conrad of Bussnang, bishop of Strasbourg, made Rupert his coadjutor in 1439 and granted him a lifelong pension in 1440. Felix V appointed Rupert bishop of Strasbourg and this was confirmed by pope Eugene IV, but Rupert was only able to move to Strasbourg in 1449. Politically he favoured the Electoral Palatinate and concluded an alliance with Frederick I. His reform of the clergy in his diocese was only partially successful. He modernized his prince-bishopric along the lines of contemporary secular states but his high demands for control met with resistance.

== Sources ==
- (in German) Rupert on Neue Deutsche Biographie
