= List of bishops, prince-bishops and archbishops of Strasbourg =

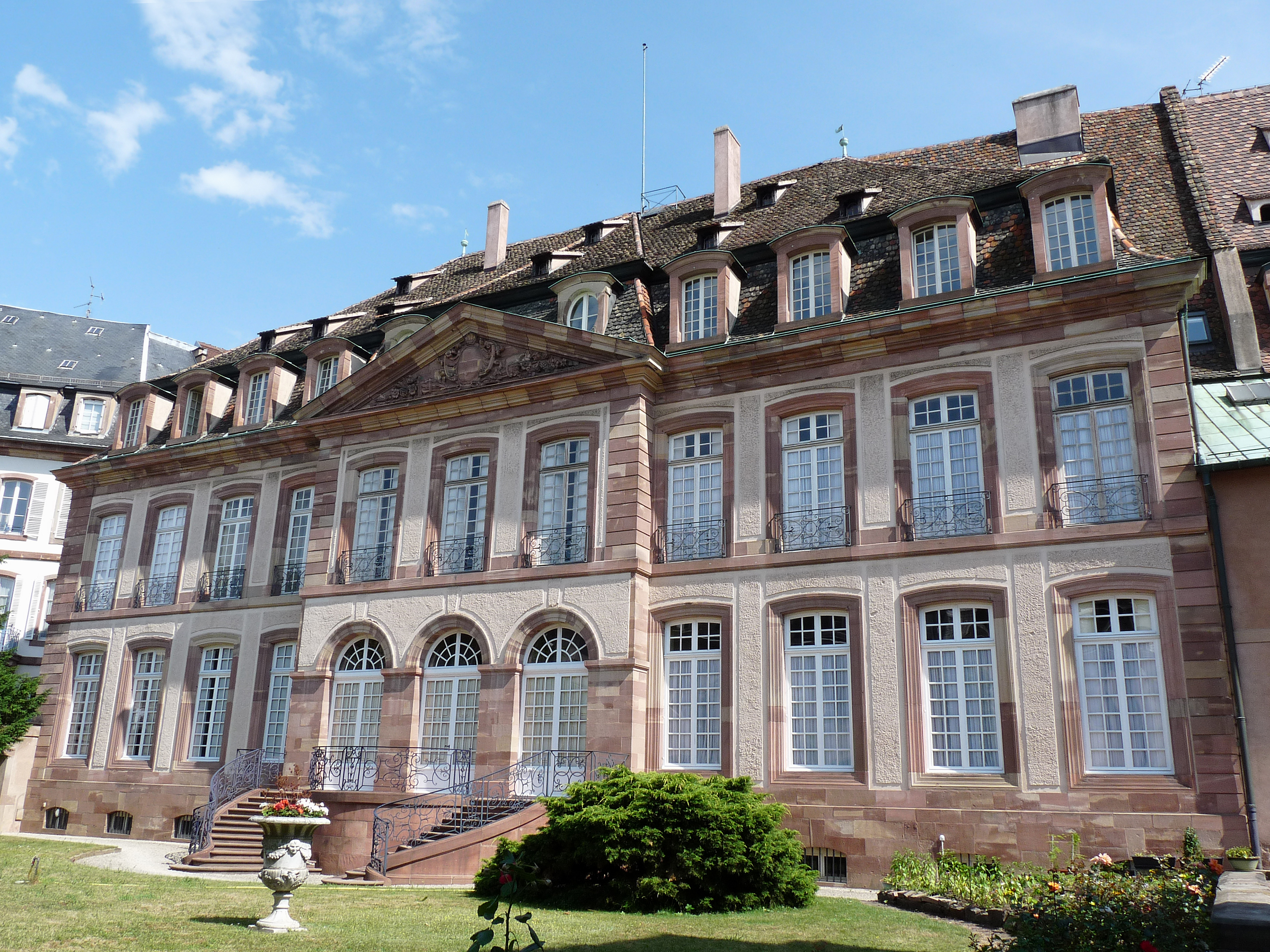
Episcopal Palace of Strasbourg seen from Rue Brûlée

These persons were bishop, archbishop or prince-bishop of the Archdiocese of Strasbourg (including historically Prince-Bishopric of Strasbourg):

== Bishops and prince-bishops ==
=== Up to 10th century ===
- St Amandus
- Justinus von Straßburg
- Maximinus von Straßburg
- Valentinus
- Solarius
- St Arbogast
- St Florentius
- Ansoaldus
- Biulfus
- Magnus von Straßburg
- Aldo
- Garoinus
- Landbertus
- Rotharius
- Rodobaldus
- Magnebertus
- Lobiolus
- Gundoaldus
- Udo I ( ~ 700)
- Witgern (728 - ?)
- Wandalfried ( - 735?)
- Heddo (739 – 765)
- Ailidulf (765?)
- Remigius of Strasbourg (765 - March 20, 783)
- Ratho (783 – 815)
- Udo II (815)
- Erlehard (815? - 822?)
- Adeloch (817 - April 17, 840)
- Bernald (840 - November 21, 875)
- Udo III (840)
- Rathold (875 - May 10, 888)
- Reginhard (876 – 888)
- Walram (888 – 906)
- Otbert (906 - August 30, 913)
- Gozfrid (September 13, 913 - November 6, 913)
- Richwin (914 - August 30, 933)
- Ruthard (933 - April 15, 950)
- Udo IV (950 - August 26, 965) (Konradiner)
- Erkanbald (965 - October 11, 991)
- Wilderold (991 - July 4, 999)
- Alawich II (999 - February 3, 1001)

=== 11th to 16th centuries ===
- Werner I von Habsburg (1001 - October 28, 1028)
- William I (1028/1029 - November 7, 1047) (Salier)
- Wizelin (Hezilo) (1048 - January 15, 1065)
- Werner II von Achalm (1065 – 1079)
- Theobald (1079 – 1084)
- Otto von Büren (1085 - August 3, 1100) (Staufer)
- Balduin (1100)
- Kuno (1100 – 1123)
- Bruno von Hochberg (1123 – 1126)
- Eberhard (1126 – 1127)
- Bruno von Hochberg (1129 - March 22, 1131)
- Gebhard von Urach (1131 – 1141)
- Burkhard I (1141 - July 10, 1162)
- Rudolf (1162 – 1179)
- Konrad I (1179 - December 21, 1180)
- Heinrich I von Hasenburg (1181 - March 25, 1190)
- Konrad II von Hühnenburg (1190 - November 3, 1202)
- Heinrich II von Veringen (1202 - March 11, 1223)
- Berthold I von Teck (1223 – 1244)
- Heinrich III von Stahleck (1243 – March 4, 1260)
- Walter von Geroldseck (1260 - February 12, 1263)
- Heinrich IV von Geroldseck (1263 – 1273)
- Konrad of Lichtenberg (1273 - August 1, 1299)
- Friedrich I von Lichtenberg (1299 - December 20, 1306)
- Johann I von Dürbheim (Diepenheim) (1307 - November 6, 1328)
- Berthold II of Bucheck (1328 - November 25, 1353)
- Johann II von Lichtenberg (1353 - September 14, 1365)
- Johann III von Luxemburg-Ligny (1366 - April 4, 1371)
- Lamprecht of Brunn (1371 - April 20, 1374)
- Friedrich II von Blankenheim (1375 – 1393)
- Ludwig von Thierstein (1393)
- Burkhard II von Lützelstein (1393 – 1394)
- Wilhelm II von Diest (1394 - October 6, 1439)
- Konrad IV von Busnang (1439 - November 11, 1440, † 1471)
- Ruprecht von Pfalz-Simmern (1440 - October 18, 1478)
- Albrecht von Pfalz-Mosbach (1478 - August 20, 1506)
- Wilhelm III von Hohenstein (1506 - June 29, 1541)
- Erasmus Schenk von Limburg (1541 - November 27, 1568)
- Johann IV von Manderscheid (1568 – 1592)
- Johann Georg von Brandenburg (1592 – 1604)

Son of Joachim III Frederick, Elector of Brandenburg. Elected by the majority Protestant canons of Strasbourg in 1592. Resigned in 1604.

=== From 17th century ===
- Charles of Lorraine (1592 / 1604 – November 24, 1607).

Son of Charles III, Duke of Lorraine. Elected by the minority Catholic canons of Strasbourg in 1592. Accepted as bishop by both parties in 1604 upon Johann Georg's resignation. Also Bishop of Metz from 1578.

- Leopold V, Archduke of Austria (1607 – 1626)
- Leopold William, Archduke of Austria (1626 – November 20, 1662)
- Francis Egon of Fürstenberg (1663 – April 1, 1682)
- Wilhelm Egon von Fürstenberg (1682 – April 10, 1704)
- Armand Gaston Maximilien de Rohan (1704-1749)
- François-Armand-Auguste de Rohan-Soubise-Ventadour (1749-1756)
- Louis César Constantin, prince de Rohan-Guéméné (1756-1779)
- Louis René Édouard de Rohan-Guéméné (1779 - November 29, 1801, died 1803)
- Jean Pierre Saurine (April 29, 1802 – May 7, 1813)

Post vacant, 1813 – 1820

- Gustav Maximilian Prinz von Croy (August 23, 1820 - November 17, 1823, died 1844)
- Claudius Maria Paul Tharin (1823 – 1826)
- Johann Franz Lepape von Trevern (1826 - August 27, 1842)
- Andreas Räß (1842 - November 17, 1887)
- Peter Paul Stumpf (1887 - August 10, 1890)
- Adolf Fritzen (June 1, 1891 - July 1919)
- Charles Joseph Eugène Ruch (August 1, 1919 - August 29, 1945)
- Jean Julien Weber (1945 - January 1, 1967)
- Léon Arthur Elchinger (1967 - July 16, 1984)

== Archbishops ==
- Charles Amarin Brand (16 July 1984 – 23 October 1997) (with rank of archbishop from 1988)
- Joseph Doré (23 October 1997 – 25 August 2006)
- Jean-Pierre Grallet (21 April 2007 – 18 February 2017)
- Luc Ravel (18 February 2017 – 27 May 2023)
- Pascal Delannoy (28 February 2024–)
