= Radbot of Klettgau =

11th-century German nobleman and first of the Habsburg line

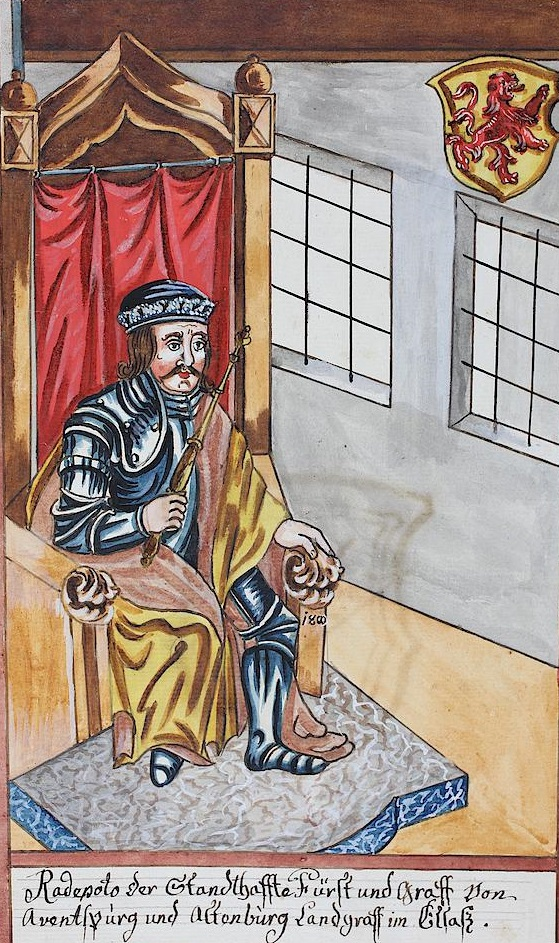
An earlier rendering of Radbot reproduced in the first volume of the c. 1800 Chronicle of the Habsburgs.

Radbot of Klettgau (German: Radbot von Klettgau; c. 985 – 1045) was a count of Klettgau (Graf von Klettgau) on the High Rhine in Swabia. Radbot was one of the progenitors of the Habsburg dynasty, who took their name from the fortress Radbot erected and named Habsburg.

Radbot was probably the second son of Lanzelin of Klettgau (son of Guntram the Rich, a count in Breisgau) and the younger brother of Werner I, bishop of Strasbourg. In 1010, he married Ita or Ida (23 July a. 979 – post 1035), daughter of Adalbert II (d. 1033), Count of Saargau and Metz of the House of Matfriede, and Judith, daughter of Conrad I of Swabia. She was the sister or half-sister of Kuno of Rheinfelden, father of Rudolf, Duke of Swabia, who acted as anti-king of Germany in the 1070s. Radbot and Ida's son was Werner I, count of Habsburg.

Radbot built Habsburg Castle around 1025 and established Muri Abbey in 1027, which was filled by Benedictine monks descending from Einsiedeln Abbey. He died in 1045, either from an illness or—more likely—an assassination.

Radbot of Klettgau House of Habsburg Born: 985 Died: 1045
Regnal titles
Preceded by Established	Count of Klettgau; 991–1045	Succeeded by Werner I
