= Habsburg Castle =

Castle in Aargau, Switzerland

- Schloss Habsburg
- Habsburg, Switzerland
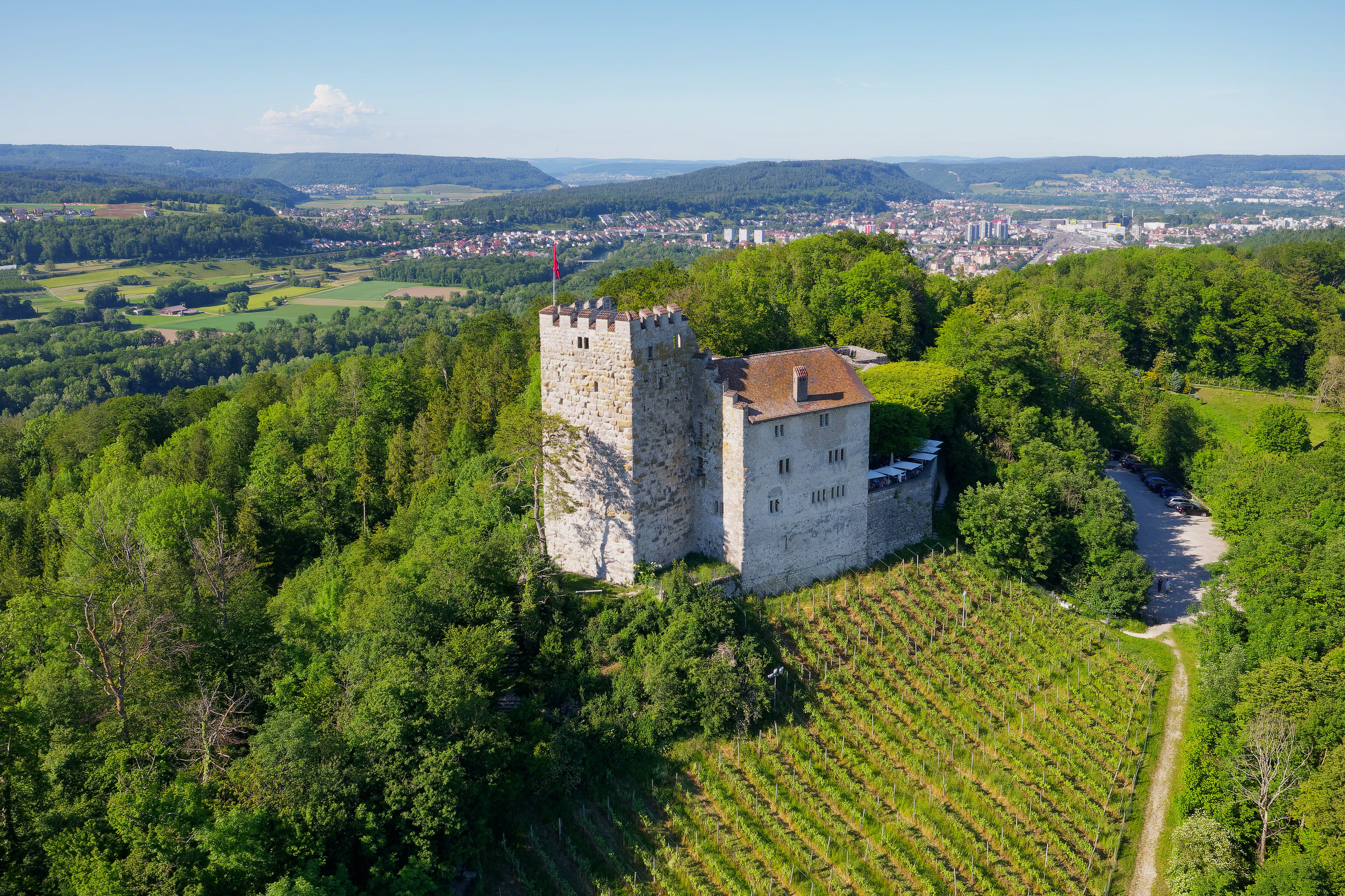
- Habsburg Castle

Site information
- Type: hill castle, summit location
- Code: CH-AG
- Condition: West part restored; east ruins

Location
- Location within Canton of Aargau Location within Switzerland
- Coordinates: 47°27′45.86″N 8°10′51.74″E
- Height: 20 meters

Site history
- Built: Around 1020/30 to 1300

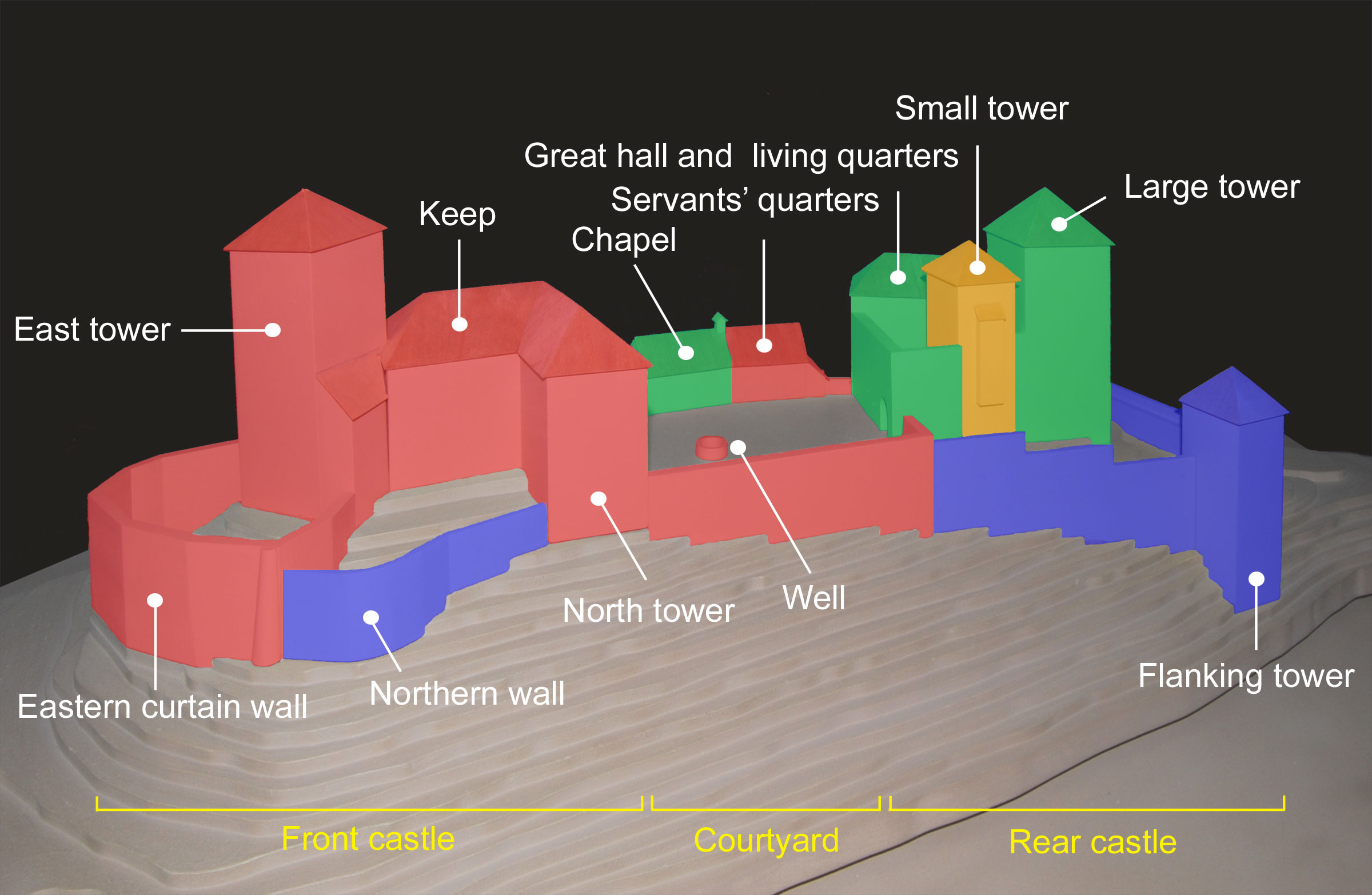
The castle in 1250, seen from the north. ██ Built before 1100. 1600 in ruins. ██ Built between 1100 and 1250. 1600 in ruins. ██ Built before 1100. 1600 still standing. ██ Built between 1100 and 1250. 1600 still standing. Except for the chapel, the green and orange coloured buildings still exist today.

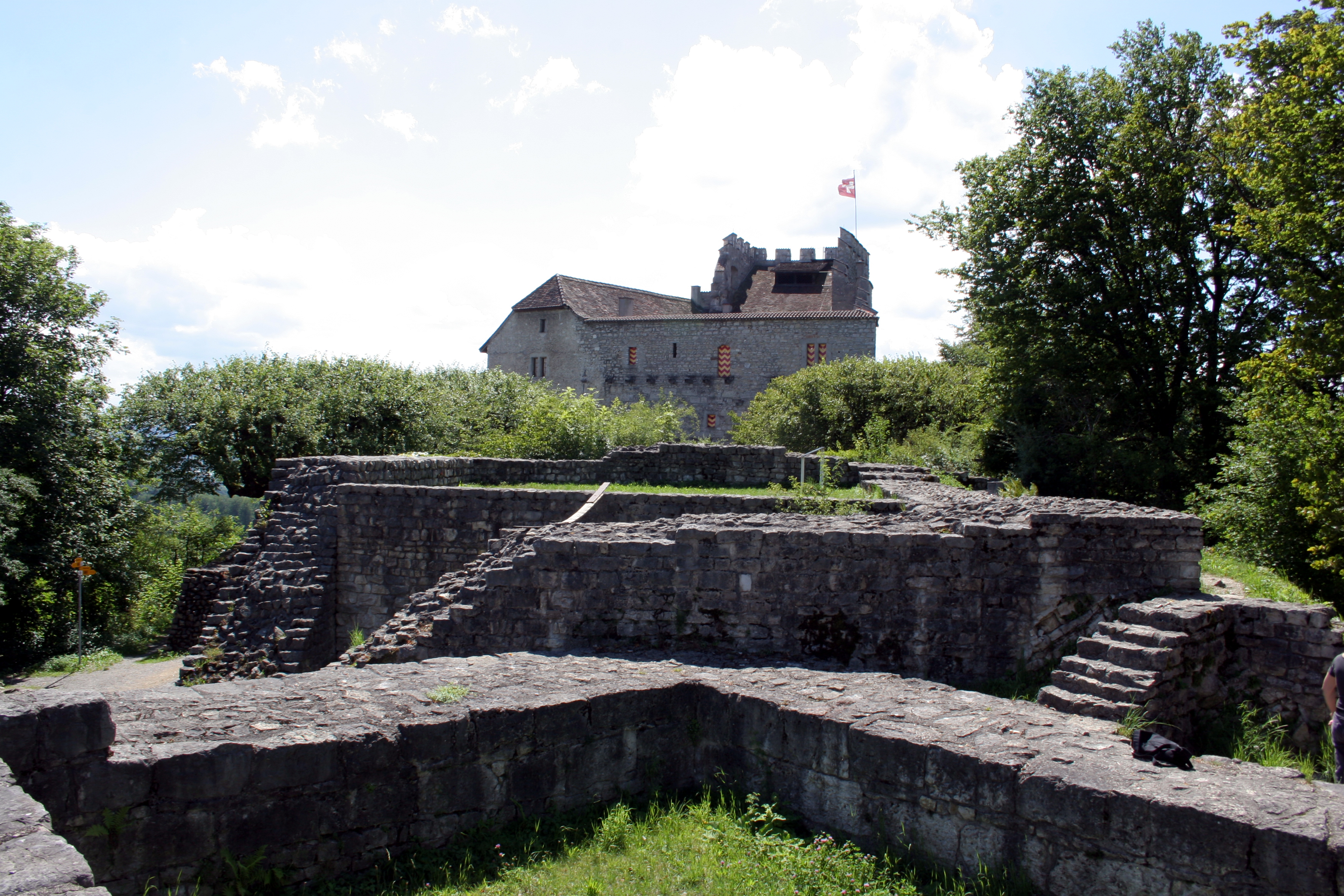
Ruins of former structures in foreground of existing buildings.

Habsburg Castle (German: Schloss Habsburg, lit. 'Castle of the Hawk's hill', pronounced [ˌʃlɔs ˈhaːpsbʊʁk]) is a medieval Swiss fortress located in what is now Habsburg, Switzerland, in the canton of Aargau, near the Aar River. At the time of its construction, the location was part of the Duchy of Swabia. Habsburg Castle is the original seat of the titular House of Habsburg, which became one of the leading imperial and royal dynasties in Europe. It is listed as a Swiss heritage site of national significance.

== History ==
The castle was built around 1020 by Count Radbot, of the nearby county of Klettgau in the Duchy of Swabia, and Werner, Bishop of Strasbourg. They had the castle erected 35 km southwest of Klettgau, on the Aar, the largest tributary of the High Rhine. It is believed that he named the castle after a hawk (German: Habicht) seen sitting on its walls. Some historians and linguists believe the name may come from the Middle High German word hab/hap meaning ford, as it is located near a ford of the Aar River.

The name of "Habsburg" was not added to the noble title until Radbot's grandson, Otto II. He added "von Habsburg" to his title, thus beginning the House of Habsburg.

Habsburg Castle's importance diminished after Radbot's seventh generation descendant Rudolph moved the family's power base to Austria in 1276. Habsburg Castle remained property of the House of Habsburg until 1415, when Duke Frederick IV of Austria lost the canton of Aargau to the Swiss Confederacy.

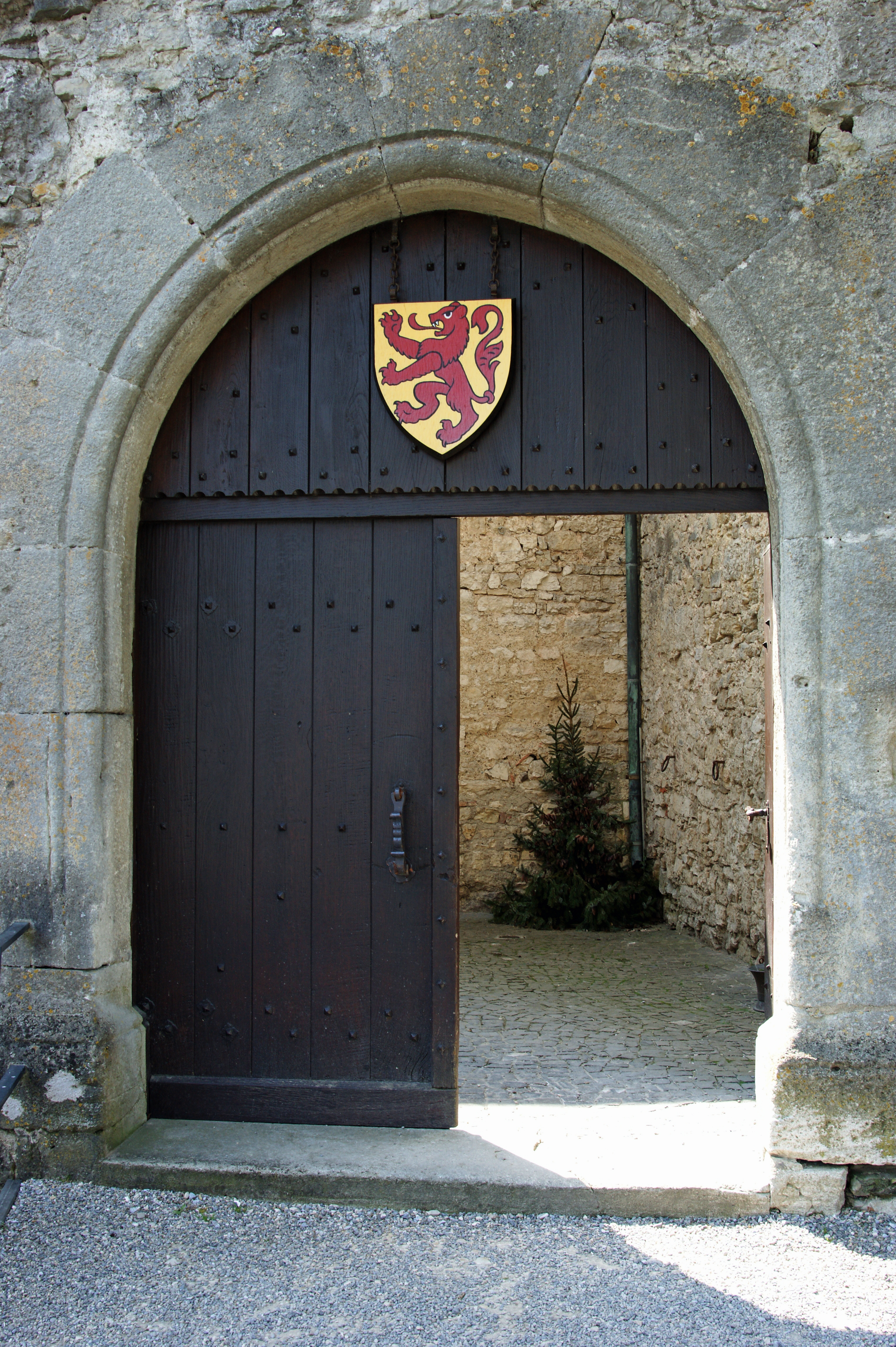
Main gate with a modern rendition of the Habsburg coat of arms with a red lion

Coat of arms of the municipality of Habsburg

The original coat of arms to fly over Habsburg Castle, a red lion on a golden field, remained part of the Austrian arms up to the end of the imperial period. The modern arms of the municipality of Habsburg, Switzerland, depict Habsburg Castle.

The area around the castle was covered by forests that were only cleared around 1500, nearly half a millennium after Habsburg Castle was first constructed.

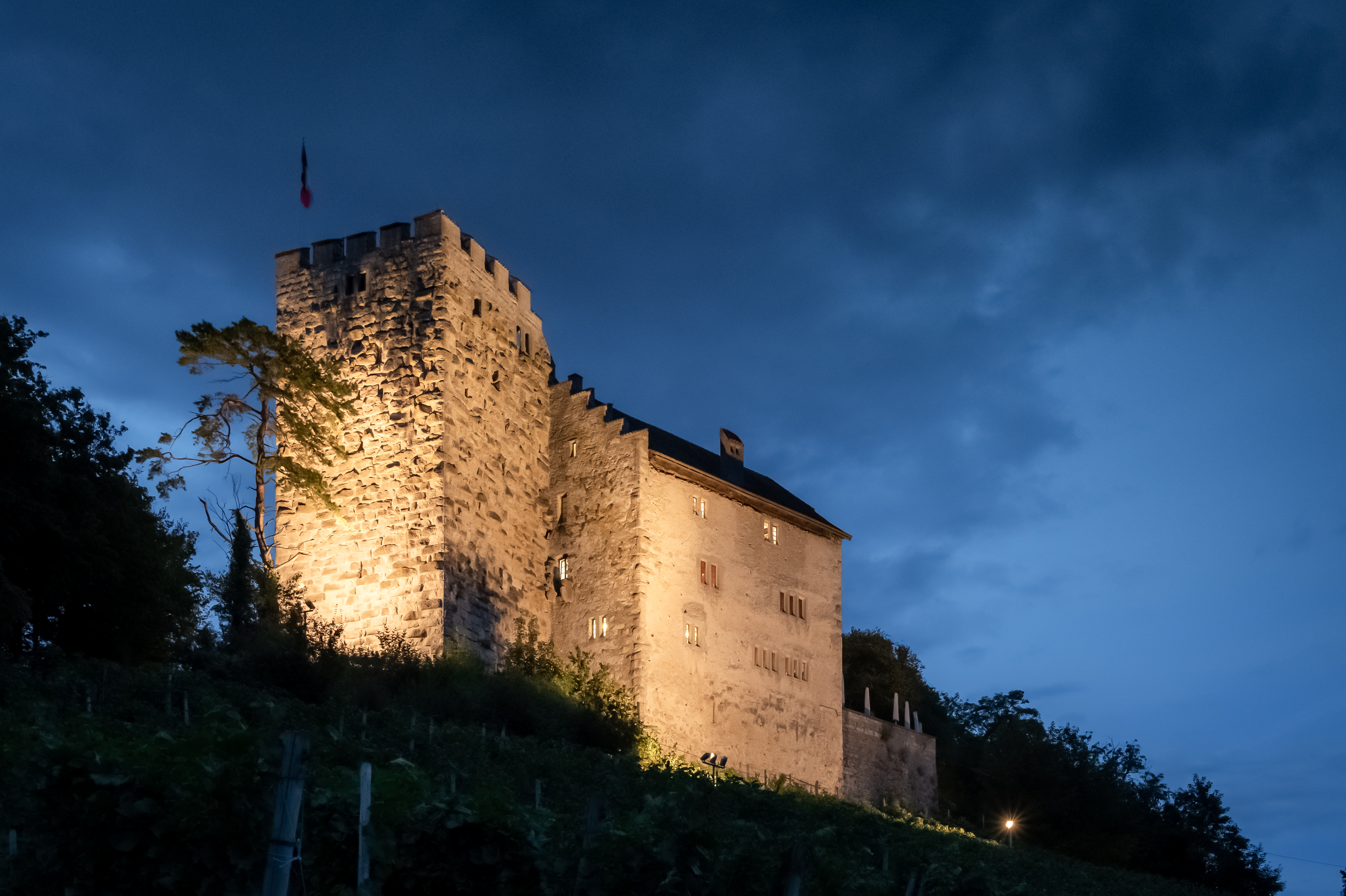
View from the South at dusk

The castle has been owned by the Canton of Aargau since 1804. It became part of Museum Aargau in 2009. Today the "large" and "small" towers of the original castle are preserved, attached to a residential building of the 13th century, while large parts of the complex lie in ruins. The extent of its eastern part is recognizable only by foundation walls. The palatial residence hosts a restaurant and a small exhibition.
