= Hans Meiger of Werde =

German stonemason, architect and builder

Hans Meiger of Werde, Hans Hammer or Hans Hammerer, (born between 1440 and 1445; died summer 1519) was a German stonemason, architect and builder of the late Gothic period, most notable for his design and construction of the pulpits at Strasbourg Cathedral (1486–1490) and Notre-Dame-de-la-Nativité in Saverne.
