= Conrad IV of Bussnang =

Bishop of Strasbourg

Conrad IV of Bussnang or of Bußlingen (died 12 March 1471, Rufach) was a 15th-century Roman Catholic clergyman. He was prince-bishop of Strasbourg from 1439, under emperor Albert II of Germany, pope Eugene IV and his metropolitan bishop Dietrich Schenk von Erbach, bishop of Mainz.

== Bibliography ==
- Ludwig Gabriel Glöckler: Geschichte des Bistums Straßburg. Druck Le Roux, Straßburg 1879, S. 319–321
