= Werner I (bishop of Strasbourg) =

11th-century bishop of Strasbourg

Werner I, Bishop of Strasbourg (ca. 975/980-1028) served from 1002 until his death on 28 October 1028. Werner I may have been one of six sons of Lanzelin of Klettgau, and also the brother of Radbot of Klettgau, a founder of the Habsburg dynasty. However, the sources that identify Werner with this Habsburg lineage are apocryphal, and therefore his connection to the family has been questioned.

He was close to the later German Emperor Henry II, whom he helped to be elected king (1002). As a consequence of the imperial favor this brought him, he was given control of the Abbey of St. Stephen in Strasbourg in 1003 and the Abbey of Schwarzach (Bavaria) in 1014. He further received privileges to hunt, procure lumber, and exercise other rights in certain undeveloped lands (known as a Wildbann) in Alsace in 1017. Often found in the emperor's entourage, Werner fought for him against King Rudolf III of Burgundy around 1020.

Later he was a supporter of Emperor Conrad II and accompanied him to his imperial coronation in Rome in 1027, then as a marriage broker envoy to Constantinople.

He may have had a part in the foundation of the Muri Monastery (though the source for this connection is potentially untrustworthy) and appears to have contributed to the rebuilding and expansion of the Strasbourg cathedral. Although Werner is attested in the 'Will of Bishop Wernher of Strassburg' as an early Habsburg, this document purported to be written in 1027 when it was actually written around 1085. On the other hand, in the Acta Murensia he is listed as a member of Lorraine Ducal House.

Catholic Church titles
Preceded by Alawich II	Bishop of Strasbourg; 1001–1028	Succeeded by Wilhelm I
