= Notre-Dame-de-la-Nativité (Saverne) =

Coordinates: 48.7412°N 7.3640°E

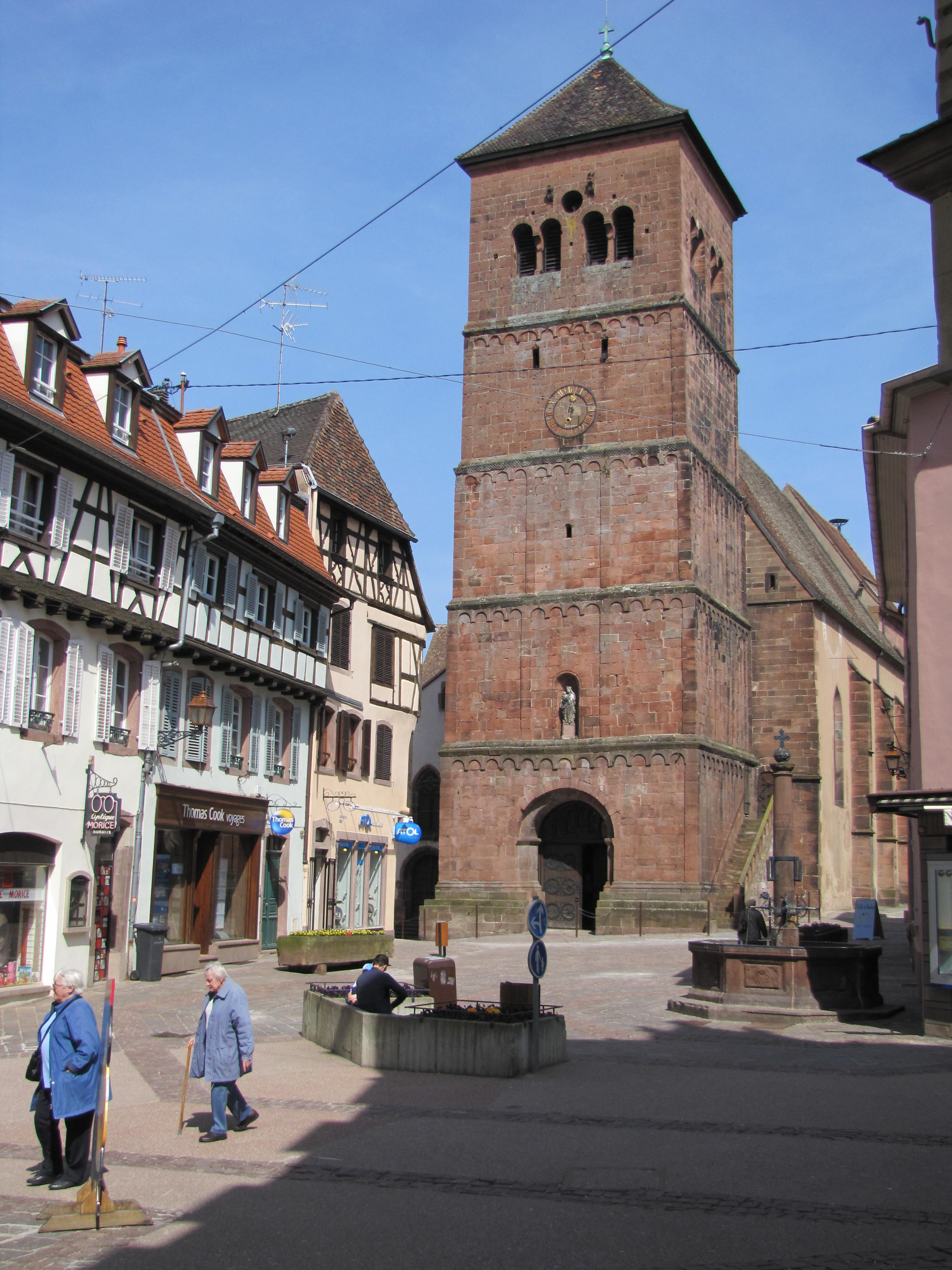
The church.

Notre-Dame-de-la-Nativité is the main church in Saverne, Bas-Rhin, France. It was first built in the 12th century as a parish church before being re-consecrated to saint Bartholomew in the late 13th century. It was converted into a collegiate church of Augustinian Canons Regular in the 14th and 15th century and held that status by 1485 at the latest. It is now the town's parish church and has been listed a historic monument since 1977.

The oldest items of church furniture are the 1495 pulpit (with stone marks by Hans Hammer, master mason at Strasbourg Cathedral) and a carved wooden sculpture of the Virgin and Child from the same era, probably by Nikolaus Hagenauer. The choir has a 16th-century crucifix, a 15th-century pieta and part of a limewood sculpture of the Assumption, probably from a 1486 altarpiece. The windows in the main nave were almost completely destroyed by a bombing raid on the night of 30–31 July 1918.

== Architecture ==
=== Bell Tower Porch ===
The bell tower is the part of the church that displays the most Romanesque style, with its archery banners and its checkered frieze that is typical of Romanesque buildings in the region, such as Marmoutier, Reutenbourg or Schweheim. The original tower had only four levels that were surmounted by a simple roof with two inclined slopes. The roof was raised at the end of the 14th century. This is why the upper two levels of the current tower are made of different stones and includes claw holes in comparison to the bottom levels of the church. During this time, a large frame spire was also built at the top of the church. This spire was knocked down in 1760 and was then replaced with a pyramid roof. This roof was then slightly modified in 1834, which gave it its current shape. During this time, the last seats of the tower were also modified, which also explains their different aspect. The last level of the bell tower opens to the outside with twin bays with Romanesque style columns on each side. The staircase leaning to the South side of the church was built in the 19th century. Accessible by this staircase is the central part of the church. From the nave, there is access to the upper floors of the bell tower as well as the set of attics.

The arch above the gate into the church is very simple and has no embellishments upon it. The doors of the church that enclose it were installed in 1894 and are a Neo-Romanesque style, inspired by the doors of the church of Saint-Jean-Saverne. To the right of the door, there is an engraved inscription that is 183cm in length. The inscription is in German and reads ‘Dis it's di holz dan: Zorn. An engraving representing a rider, almost erased, is visible to the left of the inscription. The niche above the door is possibly a post construction modification. The statue of the Virgin and Child was installed 1874, replacing a previous statue of the Virgin and Child from the 15th century, which is now on display at the Musée de Saverne.

==== References ====
1. Grodecki, Louis (1966). "Archaeological Notes on the Parish Church". Bulletin of the Society of History and Archaeology of Saverne and Surroundings. 3–4 (55–56): 16 – via Gallica.
2. Grodecki, Louis (1966). "Archaeological Notes on the Parish Church". Bulletin of the Society of History and Archaeology of Saverne and Surroundings. 3–4 (55–56): 16 – via Gallica.
3. Grodecki, Louis (1966). "Archaeological Notes on the Parish Church". Bulletin of the Society of History and Archaeology of Saverne and Surroundings. 3–4 (55–56): 18 – via Gallica.
4. Bischoff, Henri (1974). "The Church of Notre-Dame de Saverne after the transformations carried out from 1969 to 1973". Bulletin of the Society of History and Archaeology of Saverne and Surroundings. 1 (85): 1–5 – via Gallica.
5. Grodecki, Louis (1966). "Archaeological Notes on the Parish Church". Bulletin of the Society of History and Archaeology of Saverne and Surroundings. 3–4 (55–56): 18 – via Gallica.
6. Heitz, Henri (1966). "Memories and Remains of the Parish Church at the Museum of Saverne". Bulletin of the Society of History and Archaeology of Saverne and Surroundings. 3–4 (55–56): 55–57 – via Gallica.

===== Sources =====
- Base Mérimée: IA00055464, Ministère français de la Culture. (in French)
