= Habsburg family tree =

Family tree of the Habsburg family

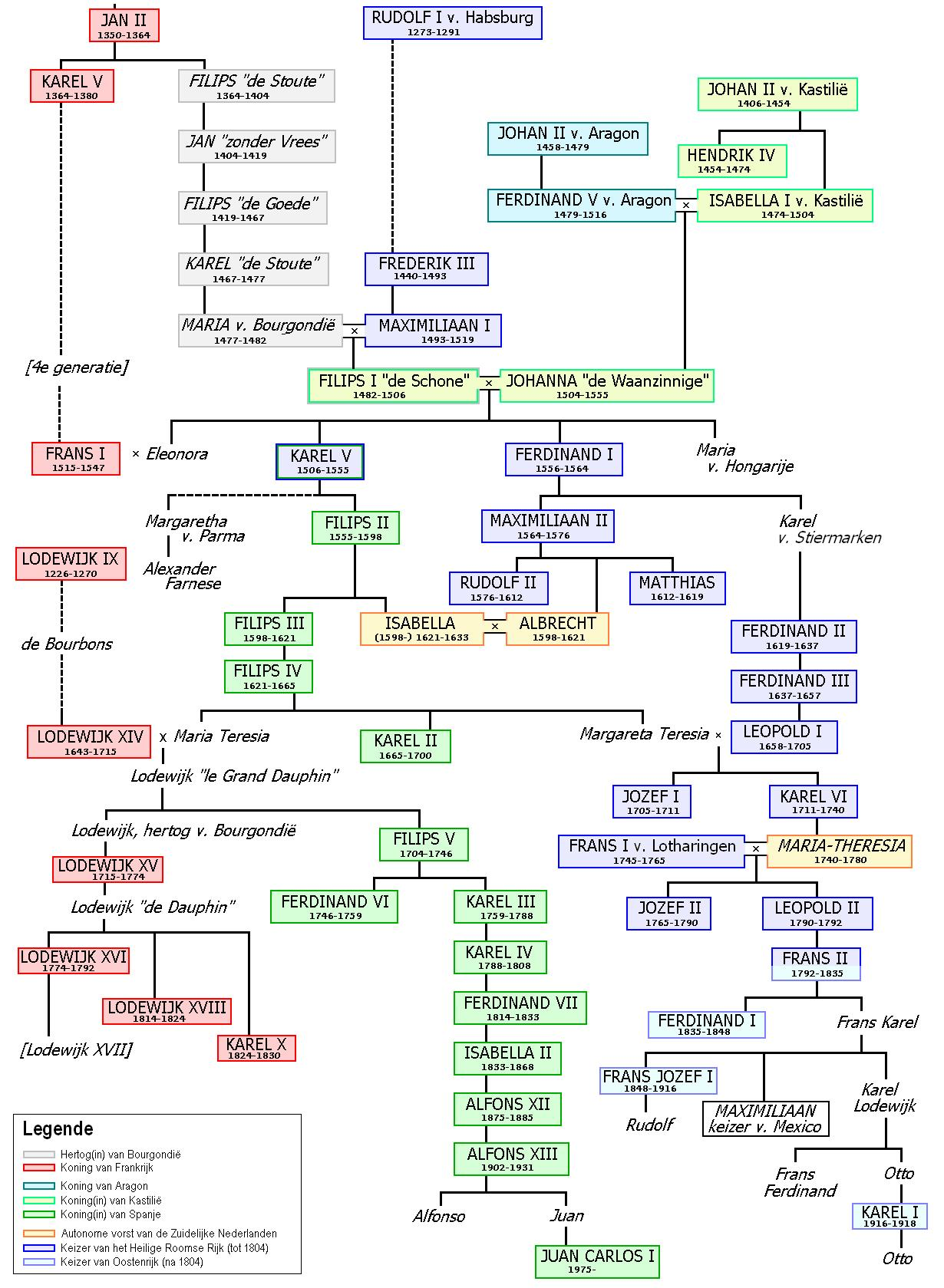
Habsburg family tree

This is a family tree of the Habsburg family. This family tree only includes male scions of the House of Habsburg from 1096 to 1564. Otto II was the first to take the Habsburg Castle name as his own, adding "von Habsburg" to his title and creating the House of Habsburg.

== Ancestors of the Habsburgs ==
Fragmentary references (see below) cite the Habsburgs as descendants of the early Germanic Etichonider, probably of Frankish, Burgundian or Visigothic origin, who ruled the Duchy of Alsace in the Early Middle Ages (7th–10th centuries). The dynasty is named for Eticho (also known as Aldarich) who ruled from 662 to 690.

Eticho I Adalric (635–690) r. 662–690; Count of Alsace
Adalbert I (665–720) r. 690–720; Count of Alsace
Eticho II (700–723) r. 722–723; Count of Nordgau
Alberic I d. 747 r. 723–747; Count of Nordgau
Eberhard II d. 777 r. 765–777; Count of Nordgau
Eberhard III of Dillingen d. 874 r. 817–864; Count of Nordgau
Hugo III d. 940 r. 910–940; Count of Nordgau
Guntram the Rich; Count in Breisgau c. 920–973 member of Etichonider family	Eberhard IV d. 972/3

== Early Habsburgs ==
Family tree of the ancestors of the Habsburg family, largely before becoming Holy Roman Emperors and (Arch)Dukes of Austria. This family tree only includes male scions of the House of Habsburg from 920 to 1308. Otto II was probably the first to take the Habsburg Castle name as his own, adding "von Habsburg" to his title and creating the House of Habsburg. See below for more references.

Guntram the Rich c. 920–973; Count in Breisgau member of Etichonider family
Lanzelin of Klettgau and Altenburg c. 940-981/991
Werner I c. 978/980–1028; Bishop of Strasbourg	Radbot of Klettgau c. 985–1045; Count of Klettgau, Thurgau, Onertau and Altemburg r. 991–1045 (built Habsburg Castle)
Werner I the Pious c. 1030–1096; Count of Klettgau, Thurgau, Onertau and Altemburg r. 1045–1096
Otto II d. 1111; Count of Klettgau, Thurgau, Onertau and Altemburg r. 1096–1111
Werner II d. 1167; Count of Habsburg r. 1111–1167
Otto III; 1166–1174; Bishop of Constance	Albert III d. 1199; Count of Habsburg r. 1167–1199
Rudolf II d. 1232; Count of Habsburg r. 1199–1232
Albert IV c. 1188–1239 co-Count of Habsburg r. 1232–1239	Rudolf III co-Count of Habsburg r. 1232; Count of Laufenburg r. 1232–1249
Rudolf IV (I); 1218–1291; Count of Habsburg r. 1240–1291; King of Germany r. 1273–1291; Duke of Carinthia r. 1276–1286; Duke of Austria and Styria r. 1278–1282	Eberhard I 1227–1284; Count of Kiburg r. 1249–1284	Gottfried I Count of Laufenburg r. 1249–1271
Albert I 1255–1308; Duke of Austria, Styria and Carniola r. 1282–1308; King of Germany r. 1298–1308	Rudolf II c. 1270–1290 co-Duke of Styria r. 1282–1290 co-Duke of Austria r. 1282–1283	Kiburg Line; 1284–1414	Laufenburg Line; 1271–1408
House of Austria see below	John Parricida c. 1290–1312/1313 (murdered his uncle Albert I)

== Middle Habsburgs ==
Male scions of the direct House of Habsburg who survived to adulthood:

Rudolf I of Germany; 1218–1291; Duke of Austria r. 1273–1291
Albert I of Germany; 1255–1308; Duke of Austria r. 1282–1308	Hartmann; 1263–1281	Rudolf II; 1270–1290; Duke of Austria r. 1282–1283
Rudolf I/III of Bohemia; 1281–1307; Duke of Austria r. 1298–1307	Frederick I/III the Fair c. 1289–1330 co-Duke of Austria r. 1308–1330	Leopold I the Glorious; 1290–1326 co-Duke of Austria r. 1308–1326	Albert II the Wise; 1298–1358 co-Duke of Austria r. 1330–1358	Henry the Friendly; 1299–1327	Otto the Merry; 1301–1339 co-Duke of Austria r. 1330–1339	John; Parricida c. 1290–1312/13
Rudolf IV; 1339–1365; Duke of Austria r. 1358–1365	Frederick III; 1347–1362	Albert III; 1349–1395 co-Duke of Austria r. 1365–1379; Duke of Austria r. 1379–1395 co-Duke of Lower Austria and co-Count of Tyrol r. 1365–1379; Count of Tyrol r. 1386–1395	Leopold III; 1351–1386 co-Duke of Austria r. 1365–1379 co-Duke of Inner and Further Austria and Count of Tyrol r. 1379–1386	Frederick II; 1327–1344 co-Duke of Austria r. 1339–1344	Leopold II; 1328–1344 co-Duke of Austria r. 1339–1344
Albert IV; 1377–1404; Duke of Lower Austria r. 1395–1404	William c. 1370–1406 co-Duke of Austria r. 1386–1396 co-Count of Tyrol r. 1386–1406; Duke of Inner and Further Austria r. 1396–1406	Leopold IV; 1371–1411 co-Duke of Further Austria and co-Count of Tyrol r. 1386–1406; Duke of Further Austria r. 1406–1411	Ernest; 1377–1424; Duke of Inner Austria r. 1406–1424	Frederick IV; 1382–1439; Count of Tyrol r. 1406–1439; Duke of Further Austria r. 1411–1439
Albert II of Germany; 1397–1439; Duke of Lower Austria r. 1404–1439	Frederick III; HRE; 1415–1493	Albert VI; Archduke of Austria; 1418–1463	Sigismund; Archduke of Austria; 1427–1496
Ladislaus the Posthumous; 1440–1457; Duke of Lower Austria r. 1440–1453; Archduke of Lower Austria r. 1453–1457	Maximilian I HRE; 1459–1519
Philip I of Castile; 1478–1506
Charles V HRE; 1500–1558	Ferdinand I HRE; 1503–1564
Philip II of Spain; 1527–1598	Maximilian II; HRE; 1527–1576	Ferdinand II; Archduke of Austria; 1529–1595	Charles II; Archduke of Austria; 1540–1590
Carlos; Prince of Asturias; 1545–1568	Philip III of Spain; 1578–1621	Rudolf II; 1552–1612; Archduke of Lower and Upper Austria r. 1576–1608; Holy Roman Emperor r. 1576–1612	Ernest of Austria; 1553–1595	Matthias; 1557–1619; Archduke of Further Austria r. 1595–1612, r. 1618–1619; Archduke of Lower and Upper Austria r. 1608–1619; Holy Roman Emperor r. 1612–1619	Maximilian III; 1558–1618; Archduke of Further Austria r. 1612–1618	Albert VII; 1559–1621; Archduke of Lower and Upper Austria r. 1619	Charles; Margrave of Burgau; 1560–1618	Ferdinand II; HRE; 1578–1637	Maximilian Ernest of Austria; 1583–1616	Leopold V Archduke of Austria; 1586–1632	Charles of Austria; 1590–1624
Philip IV of Spain; 1605–1665	Charles of Austria; 1607–1632	Ferdinand of Austria; 1609/10–1641	Ferdinand III; HRE; 1608–1657	Leopold Wilhelm of Austria; 1614–1662	Ferdinand Charles; Archduke of Austria; 1628–1662	Sigismund Francis; Archduke of Austria; 1630–1665
Balthasar Charles; Prince of Asturias; 1629–1646	Charles II of Spain; 1661–1700	Ferdinand IV; King of the Romans; 1633–1654	Leopold I HRE; 1640–1705	Charles Joseph of Austria; 1649–1664
Joseph I HRE; 1678–1711	Charles VI; HRE; 1685–1740

== Ancestors of Charles II of Spain ==
Ancestors of Charles II of Spain
Thick red borders indicate children of consanguinity, where parents were at least second cousins.

Philip I King of Castile (Note: Charles V, Holy Roman Emperor at the Encyclopædia Britannica); 1478–1506	Joanna; Queen of Castile and Aragon; 1479–1555
Isabella of Portugal; 1503–1539	Charles V Holy Roman Emperor; 1500–1558	Ferdinand I Holy Roman Emperor (Note: Press, Volker (1990). "Maximilian II.". Neue Deutsche Biographie (in German). Vol. 16. Berlin: Duncker & Humblot. pp. 471–475. (full text online).); 1503–1564	Anna of Bohemia and Hungary; 1503–1547	Isabella of Austria; 1501–1526	Christian II; King of Denmark; 1481–1559
Maria of Austria; 1528–1603	Maximilian II; Holy Roman Emperor; 1527–1576	Anna of Austria; 1528–1590	Albert V Duke of Bavaria; 1528–1579	Christina of Denmark; 1522–1590	Francis I Duke of Lorraine; 1517–1545
Philip II; King of Spain; 1527–1598	Anna of Austria; 1549–1580	Charles II; Archduke of Austria (Note: Eder, Karl (1961). "Ferdinand II.". Neue Deutsche Biographie (in German). Vol. 5. Berlin: Duncker & Humblot. pp. 83–85. (full text online).); 1540–1590	Maria Anna of Bavaria; 1551–1608	William V Duke of Bavaria; 1548–1626	Renata of Lorraine; 1544–1602
Philip III; King of Spain; 1578–1621	Margaret of Austria; 1584–1611	Ferdinand II; Holy Roman Emperor; 1578–1637	Maria Anna of Bavaria; 1574–1616
Maria Anna of Spain; 1606–1646	Ferdinand III; Holy Roman Emperor; 1608–1657
Philip IV; King of Spain; 1605–1665	Mariana of Austria; 1634–1696
Charles II; King of Spain; 1661–1700

== Later Habsburgs/Habsburg-Lorraine ==
Similarly, this family tree only includes male scions of the House of Habsburg-Lorraine who survived to adulthood:

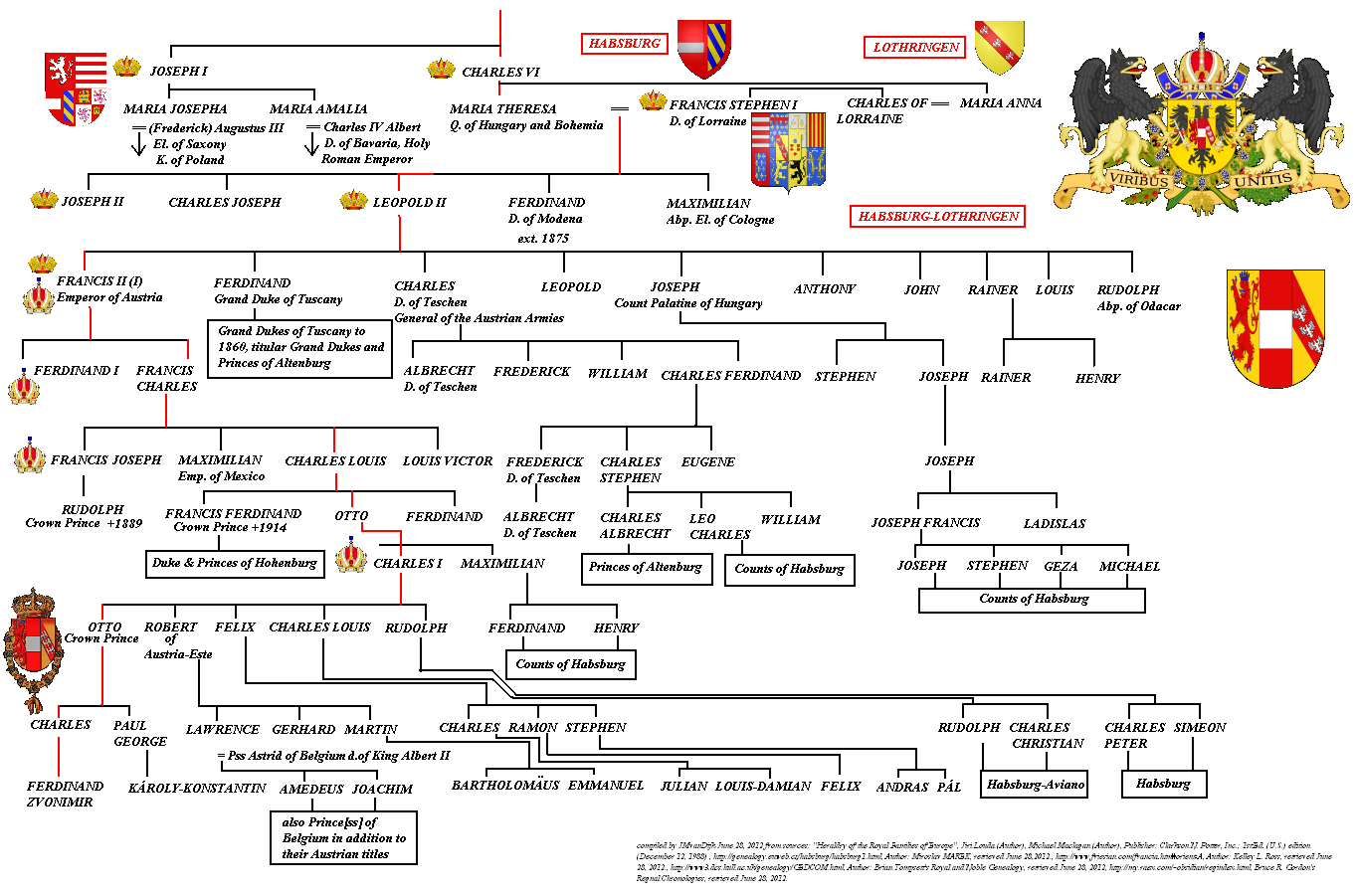

Genealogy of the House of Habsburg-Lorraine

Name of Emperor –Holy Roman Emperor; Name of Emperor –Emperor of Austria;

Name of Duke –Duke of Lorraine

Name of Archduke –Archduke of Austria in the Imperial Line; Name of Archduke –Dukes of Teschen;

Name of Archduke –House of Habsburg-Hungary; Name of Archduke –House of Habsburg-Tuscany;

Name of Archduke –House of Austria-Este;

Every member of the house had the title of Archduke of Austria and prince royal of Hungary and Bohemia.

Leopold I (1640–1705); Holy Roman Emperor, 1658
Joseph I (1678–1711)); Holy Roman Emperor, 1705	Leopold (1679–1729); Duke of Lorraine & Bar, 1690–1729	Charles VI (1685–1740); Holy Roman Emperor, 1711; Archduke of Austria, King of Bohemia, King of Hungary, etc., 1711
Maria Josepha of Austria (1699–1757); Queen consort of Poland, Grand Duchess consort of Lithuania m. Augustus III, King of Poland, Grand Duke of Lithuania, Elector of Saxony	Maria Amalia (1701–1756); Holy Roman Empress, 1742-1745 m. Charles VII, Holy Roman Emperor, Elector of Bavaria (1697–1745)	Francis Stephen (1708–1765); Duke of Lorraine & Bar, 1729-37; Grand Duke of Tuscany, 1737; Holy Roman Emperor, 1745	Maria Theresa of Austria; 1717–1780); Queen of Bohemia and Hungary, Archduchess of Austria, 1743	Maria Anna (1718–1744) s. of Maria Theresa, gov. of the Austrian Netherlands	Charles Alexander Emmanuel (1712–1780), governor of the Austrian Netherlands and Austrian army commander.
House of Habsburg-Lorraine; Holy Roman Emperors, Archduke of Austria, King of Bohemia, King of Hungary, Emperor of Austria
Joseph II (1741–1790); Holy Roman Emperor, 1765; Archduke of Austria, King of Bohemia, King of Hungary, etc., 1765/sole 1780	Maria Christina, Duchess of Teschen (1742–1798); Gov. of the Netherlands m. Albert Casimir of Saxony, Duke of Teschen	Maria Elisabeth (1743–1808)	Charles Joseph (1745-17610	Maria Amalia (1746–1804) m. Ferdinand I of Parma	Leopold II (1747–1792); Grand Duke of Tuscany, 1765–1790; Holy Roman Emperor, 1765; Archduke of Austria, King of Bohemia, King of Hungary, etc., 1790	Maria Carolina (1752–1814) m. Ferdinand I of the Two Sicilies	Ferdinand Karl, Archduke of Austria-Este (1754–1806) tit. Duke of Modena; House of Austria-Este, ext. 1875 when inherited by 2nd House of Austria-Este	Maria Antonia/Marie Antionette (1755–1793); Queen of France m. Louis XVI of France	Maximilian Francis (1756–1801); Archbishop & Elector of Cologne, 1784
Francis II/I (1768–1835); Holy Roman Emperor, 1790-1806; Archduke of Austria, King of Bohemia, King of Hungary, etc., 1790; Emperor of Austria, 1804	Ferdinand III (1769–1824); Grand Duke of Tuscany,1790–1801 & 1814–1824	Charles (1771–1847); Duke of Teschen; Generalfeldmarschall & Commander-in-Chief of Austrian Armies	Leopold (1772–1795); Palatine of Hungary, 1790	John (1782–1859); Field Marshal; Imperial Regent, 1848-1849; Counts of Meran	Anton (1779–1835); Archbishop & Elector of Cologne, Prince-Bishop of Münster, 1801-3, Grand Master of the Teutonic Order, 1804	Joseph (1776–1847); Palatine of Hungary, 1795	Rainer (1783–1853); Austrian General; Viceroy of Kingdom of Lombardy–Venetia, 1818–1848	Louis (1784–1864); Feldmarschal-Leutnant	Rudolph (1788–1831); Archbishop of Olomouc, 1819–1831
Ferdinand I (1793 – 29 June 1875); Emperor of Austria, King of Bohemia, King of Hungary, etc., 1835-1848	Francis Charles (1802–1878)	Grand Dukes of Tuscany,to 1860, titl. & Princes of Altenburg	Albert (1817–1895); Duke of Teschen; Insp. Gen. & Generalfeldmarschall	1. Friedrich; (1821–1847) &: 2. William Francis; (1827–1894), Feldzeugmeister	Charles Ferdinand (1818–1874) Feldmarschallleut.	Stephen (1817–1867); Palatine of Hungary, 1847-48	Joseph Charles (1833–1905) titl. Palatine of Hungary, 1847-48; Feldmarschallleut.	Rainer (1827–1913); Feldmarschallleut. Minister-President of Austria,1861-65	1. Leopold (1823–1898), Oberkommandant der Marine, 1864–1868; 2. Henry (1828–1891); Feldmarschallleut.
Franz Joseph I (1830–1916); Emperor of Austria, King of Bohemia, King of Hungary, etc., 1848	Maximilian I of Mexico (1832 – ex. 1867); Emperor of Mexico, 1864-67	Charles Louis (1833–1896); Heir presumptive, 1889	Louis (1842–1919); Gen. der Waffengattung	Friedrich (1856–1936); Duke of Teschen; Generalfeldmarschall & Supreme Commander of the Imperial and Royal Armed Forces, 1914-16	Charles (1860–1933); Admiral, Austro-Hungarian Navy	Eugene (1863–1954); Generalfeldmarschall	Joseph August (1872–1962); Generalfeldmarschall; Head of State of Hungary, 1919
Rudolph (1858–1889); Crown Prince of Austria-Hungary	Archduke Franz Ferdinand of Austria-Este (1863 – assas. 1914); Heir presumptive, 1896; General der Waffengattung	Otto (1865–1906); Feldmarschallleut.	Ferdinand (1868–1915)	Albert (1897–1955); Duke of Teschen	Charles (1888–1951); Austro-Hungarian and Polish Army Colonel	Leo (1893–1939); Austro-Hungarian and Polish Army Officer	William (1895–1948); Austro-Hungarian and Ukrainian Army Officer	Joseph Francis (1895–1957); Austro-Hungarian Army Captain	Ladislaus Luitpold (1901–1946)
Princes and later Dukes of Hohenburg (non-dynastic)	Charles I (1887–1922); Emperor of Austria, King of Bohemia, King of Hungary, etc., 1916-1918	Maximilian (1895–1952); Major, Austro-Hungarian Army	Princes of Altenburg (non-dynastic)	Counts of Habsburg (non-dynastic)	Joseph Árpád (1932–2017)	1. István (Stephen) (1934–2011); 2. Géza (b. 1940); 3. Michael (b. 1942)
Dr. Otto (von) Habsburg(-Lothringen) (1912–2011); Crown Prince of Austria-Hungary, 1916-1918	Robert, Archduke of Austria-Este (1915–1996); Archduke of Austria-Este, 1917	Felix (1916–2011); Sons: 1. Carlos Felipe (1954–); 2. Raimund (Ramón) (1958–2008)	Carl Ludwig (1918–2007); Sons: 1. Rudolf (b. 1950); 2. Carl Christian (b. 1954); 3. István (Esteban) (b. 1961); Habsburg-Aviano	Rudolf (1919–2010); Sons 1. Karl Peter (b. 1955); 2. Simeon Habsburg-Lothringen (b. 1958); Counts of Habsburg	Ferdinand (1918–2004); Counts of Habsburg	Heinrich (1925–2014); Counts of Habsburg	Counts of Habsburg (non-dynastic)
Karl (von) Habsburg-Lothringen (1961–)	Georg (von) Habsburg-Lothringen (1964–)	Lorenz of Austria-Este (1955–); Prince of Belgium, 1995 m. Princess Astrid of Belgium	Gerhard (1957–)	Martin (1959–)
Ferdinand Habsburg(-Lothringen) (1997–); Austrian motor racing driver	Karoly-Konstantin (b. 2004)	Amedeo of Austria-Este and Belgium (b. 1986) m. Elisabetta Maria Rosboch von Wolkenstein	Joachim of Austria-Este and Belgium (b. 1991)

== Male-line family tree ==
House of Habsburg

Original line
Albert; Count of Habsburg c. 1188–1239
Rudolf I of Germany c. 1218–1291
Albert I of Germany; 1255–1308	Hartmann; 1263–1281	Rudolf II; Duke of Austria; 1270–1290
Rudolf I of Bohemia; 1281–1307	Frederick the Fair c. 1289–1330	Leopold I Duke of Austria; 1290–1326	Albert II; Duke of Austria; 1298–1358	Henry the Friendly; 1299–1327	Otto; Duke of Austria; 1301–1339	John; Parricida c. 1290–1312/1313
Albertinian line	Leopoldian line
Rudolf IV; Duke of Austria; 1339–1365	Frederick III; 1347–1362	Albert III; Duke of Austria; 1349–1395	Leopold III; Duke of Austria; 1351–1386	Frederick II; Duke of Austria; 1327–1344	Leopold II; Duke of Austria; 1328–1344
Albert IV; Duke of Austria; 1377–1404	William; Duke of Austria c. 1370–1406	Leopold IV; Duke of Austria; 1371–1411	Ernest; Duke of Austria; 1377–1424	Frederick IV; Duke of Austria; 1382–1439
Albert II of Germany; 1397–1439	Frederick III; HRE; 1415–1493	Albert VI; Archduke of Austria; 1418–1463	Sigismund; Archduke of Austria; 1427–1496
Ladislaus the Posthumous; 1440–1457	Maximilian I HRE; 1459–1519
Philip I of Castile; 1478–1506
Spanish / Iberian line	Austrian / HRE line
Charles V HRE; 1500–1558	Ferdinand I HRE; 1503–1564
Philip II of Spain; 1527–1598	Maximilian II; HRE; 1527–1576	Ferdinand II; Archduke of Austria; 1529–1595	Charles II; Archduke of Austria; 1540–1590
Carlos; Prince of Asturias; 1545–1568	Philip III of Spain; 1578–1621	Rudolf II; HRE; 1552–1612	Ernest of Austria; 1553–1595	Matthias; HRE; 1557–1619	Maximilian III; Archduke of Austria; 1558–1618	Albert VII; Archduke of Austria; 1559–1621	Wenceslaus; Archduke of Austria; 1561–1578	Andrew; Margrave of Burgau; 1558–1600	Charles; Margrave of Burgau; 1560–1618	Ferdinand II; HRE; 1578–1637	Maximilian Ernest of Austria; 1583–1616	Leopold V Archduke of Austria; 1586–1632	Charles of Austria; 1590–1624
Philip IV of Spain; 1605–1665	Charles of Austria; 1607–1632	Ferdinand of Austria; 1609–1641	John-Charles of Austria; 1605–1619	Ferdinand III; HRE; 1608–1657	Leopold Wilhelm of Austria; 1614–1662	Ferdinand Charles; Archduke of Austria; 1628–1662	Sigismund Francis; Archduke of Austria; 1630–1665
Balthasar Charles; Prince of Asturias; 1629–1646	Charles II of Spain; 1661–1700	Ferdinand IV; King of the Romans; 1633–1654	Leopold I HRE; 1640–1705	Charles Joseph of Austria; 1649–1664
Joseph I HRE; 1678–1711	Charles VI; HRE; 1685–1740
Lorraine
Maria Theresa; HRE; 1740–1780	Francis I HRE; 1745–1765
Habsburg-Lorraine
Joseph II; HRE; 1765–1790	Leopold II; HRE; 1790–1792
Francis II; HRE; 1792–1806

== See also ==
- List of rulers of Austria
