= Klettgau =

- Municipality
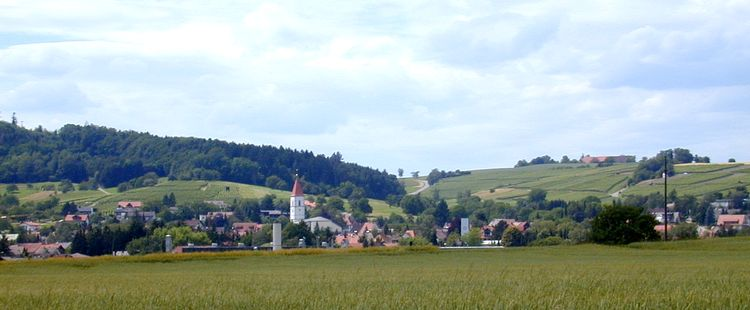
- View of Erzingen

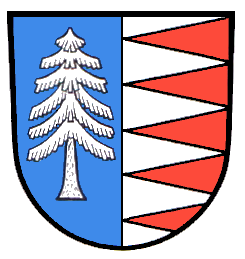
- Coat of arms

- Location of Klettgau within Waldshut district
- Interactive map of Klettgau
- Location within Germany Location within Baden-Württemberg
- Coordinates: 47°39′30″N 08°25′22″E
- Country: Germany
- State: Baden-Württemberg
- Admin. region: Freiburg
- District: Waldshut

Government
  - Mayor (2016–24): Ozan Topcuogullari

Area
  - Total: 45.87 km^{2} (17.71 sq mi)
- Elevation: 409 m (1,342 ft)

Population (2025-12-31)
  - Total: 7,427
  - Density: 161.9/km^{2} (419.4/sq mi)
- Time zone: UTC+01:00 (CET)
  - Summer (DST): UTC+02:00 (CEST)
- Postal codes: 79771
- Dialling codes: 07742
- Vehicle registration: WT
- Website: www.klettgau.de

Klettgau (German pronunciation: [ˈklɛtɡaʊ]; High Alemannic: Chleggau) is a municipality in the district of Waldshut in Baden-Württemberg, Germany. It is the center of the Klettgau historical region stretching across the Swiss border into the cantons of Aargau, Schaffhausen, and Zürich.

The municipal area includes the villages of Bühl, Erzingen, Geißlingen, Grießen, Rechberg, Riedern am Sand, and Weisweil.

== Geography ==
Klettgau is located on the Klingengraben and Schwarzbach rivers. In the east, it borders the Swiss municipalities of Trasadingen, Wilchingen and Wasterkingen. The neighbouring German municipalities are Wutöschingen, Lauchringen, Küssaberg, and Hohentengen am Hochrhein in the west, as well as Dettighofen in the east. There is a border crossing into Switzerland on the road from Erzingen to Trasadingen.

The municipal area comprises the villages of Bühl, Erzingen, Geißlingen, Grießen, Rechberg, Riedern am Sand, and Weisweil. Erzingen, Bühl, and Riedern am Sand are part of the Baden wine region.

== History ==
Erzingen was already mentioned as villa Arcingen in an 876 deed, a Swabian possession held by the Benedictie abbey of Rheinau. In 1486 it was occupied by the forces of the Old Swiss Confederacy on a campaign into the Landgraviate of Klettgau. The immediate landgraviate was inherited by the House of Schwarzenberg in 1687 with their residence in Tiengen, and it was elevated to a principality by Emperor Leopold I in 1694. After the Schwarzenberg landgraviate was mediatised in 1806, the lordship fell to the Grand Duchy of Baden in 1812.

The present-day municipality was established in a 1971 administrative reform. Bühl and Geißlingen were incorporated in 1975.

== Habsburg Rule ==
The House of Habsburg likely began to rule over the County of Klettgau when Radbot inherited it. He ended up reigning over Klettgau from 991-1045, when he was then succeeded by his son, Werner I, who reigned over Klettgau from 1045 to 1096. Otto II reigned over it after his father died, later he was the first person to become a count of Habsburg, he ruled Klettgau from 1096 to 1111. His son Werner II, who ruled over Klettgau from 1111 to 1167 would inherit. Werner was succeeded by Albert 'the Rich', (1167-1199) he was succeeded by Rudolf II. (1199-1232) He was then succeeded by Albert IV (1232-1239) Albert was then succeeded by the soon-to-be King of Germany; Rudolf I Before becoming king, Rudolf was titled Rudolf IV, Count of Habsburg. However, he would not stay a count, Rudolf was later elected king of the Germans in 1273 Rudolf later died in 1291. Rudolf was succeeded by his son, Albert I (1291-1308), who soon after inheriting the land of Klettgau from his father, would become King of Germany. His son Albert II became the first Habsburg Duke of Austria (1308-1358). His successor Rudolf IV (1358-1386) inherited the title of Klettgau. Albert II's son Leopold III (1365-1386) inherited Rudolf's titles after his death in 1365. During his later reign, he lost Klettgau and other Swiss holdings, as well as his life in the Battle of Sempach which took place in 1386. The death of Leopold III was followed by Switzerland taking all of his holdings in the region including Klettgau, but later the Swiss agreed to give the lands north of the modern Swiss border to the Habsburgs during the treaty. but Klettgau was under Swiss Influence so this is counted as the end.

== Politics ==
Seats in the municipal assembly (Gemeinderat) as of 2009 local elections:

- Christian Democratic Union: 10
- Free Voters: 6
- Alliance 90/The Greens: 4
- Social Democratic Party: 3

== Demographics ==
Population development:

Year	Inhabitants
2015	7,414
2016	7,430
2017	7,573
2018	7,569
2019	7,578
2020	7,669
2022	7,611
2023	7,649

== Economy ==
=== Business ===
- Bucher Hydraulics, founded 1923

== Transport ==
=== Railway station ===
Klettgau has a railway station located very close to the border with Switzerland, in Erzingen. The station building was completed in 1863.

The railway line from Erzingen to Schaffhausen was electrified and tracks along almost the entire route were doubled, allowing for more frequent services to run. The electrification of the line from Erzingen to Waldshut as well as from Waldshut on to Basel Badischer Bahnhof has also been agreed on and is planned.

The station is a border station and as such is in local transport tariff zones in both Germany and Switzerland.

==== Customs ====
Erzingen is, for customs purposes, a border station for passengers arriving from Switzerland. Customs checks may be performed in Erzingen station or on board trains by German officials. Systematic passport controls were abolished when Switzerland joined the Schengen Area in 2008.

== International relations ==
Klettgau is twinned with:

- Clisson, France, since 1976
- Sanza, Italy, since 2006

== Notable people ==
- Maximilian Stoll (1742–1787), physician
- Radbot, Count of Klettgau (c. 985 – c. 1045)
