= Werner von Habsburg =

Werner von Habsburg may refer to:

- Werner I, Bishop of Strasbourg (c. 979-1028)
- Werner I, Count of Habsburg (died 1096), great-great-great-great-grandfather of Rudolph I of Germany
- Werner II, Count of Habsburg (died 1167), great-great-grandfather of Rudolph I of Germany
