= Upper Alsace =

Historical region of France

Landgraviate of Upper Alsace French: Landgraviat de Haute Alsace German: Landgrafschaft Oberelsass
- Former subdivision of the Holy Roman Empire
- 1130–1648
- Coat of arms

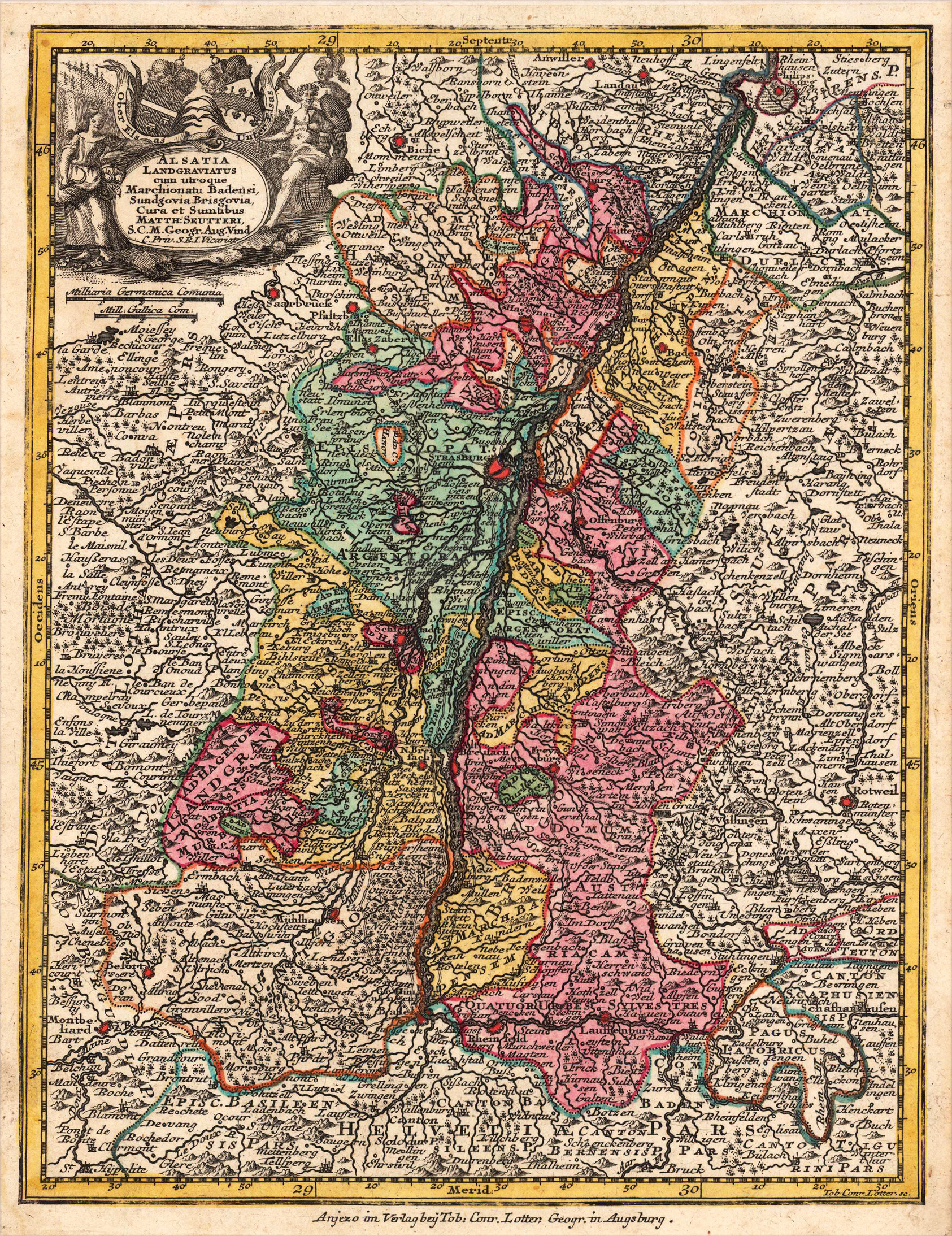
- The Upper Rhine, showing the so-called Landgraviate of Alsace on the left bank, before it was annexed to France.
- Demonym: Alsacien, Alsaciens, Alsacienne, Alsaciennes
- Government
  - Type: Landgraviate
- Landgrave of Upper Alsace
  - 1141–1167: Werner II, Count of Habsburg
  - 1632–1648: Ferdinand Charles, Archduke of Austria
- Historical era: Early Modern
  - Established: 1130
  - Treaty of Westphalia: 24 October 1648
Preceded by
| County of Sundgau |
| County of Ferrette |
| Duchy of Swabia |
Succeeded by
| Province of Alsace |
- Today part of: Republic of France

Upper Alsace (Note: Known in French as Haute-Alsace, in German Oberelsaß) (southern Alsace) was a landgraviate of the Holy Roman Empire centred on Ensisheim and Landser, north of the County of Ferrette (Pfirt). The counts of Habsburg ruled the territory from the 1130s down to its cession to France in the 17th century.

== History ==
In 1130, the Holy Roman Emperor, Lothair III of Supplinburg in order to diminish the power of the Hohenstaufen family in the region, merged three local regions into several larger fiefs. The County of Sundgau, County of Ferrette, and the parts west of the Rhine from the Duchy of Swabia were merged to form the new Landgraviate of Upper Alsace. In 1188, the first mentions of the landgraviate appear in official records, however the date of probable creation was around 1130. The landgraviate included the prementioned areas, along with several Seigneuries and city-states located in Upper Alsace.

Albert III, Count of Habsburg, received the Landgraviate of Upper Alsace from the Emperor Frederick I in 1186. Frederick's son, Duke Frederick V, was his lord with the title of duke of Alsace (Elisatiae dux).

On 9 May 1469, Duke Charles the Bold of Burgundy acquired the Landgraviate of Upper Alsace and the County of Ferrette for 50,000 Rhenish florins. At the time of its purchase, the landgraviate was heavily mortgaged and pawned. Landser was mortgaged to Thüring von Hallwill for 7,000 florins. On 20 September Charles appointed Peter von Hagenbach as the "grand bailiff (Landvogt) of Ferrette and Alsace" with his seat at Ensisheim. This official was a successor of the previous Austrian-appointed Landvogt, and thus in the service of the landgrave of Upper Alsace. The Landvogtei (bailiwick) of Alsace itself was an imperial office then mortgaged to the Electoral Palatinate.

On 14 April 1646, the imperial ambassador Maximilian von und zu Trauttmansdorff, during negotiations to end the Thirty Years' War, offered "Upper and Lower Alsace and the Sundgau, under the title of Landgraviate of Alsace" to the French. There was no such territory, since Alsace was at the time divided into several jurisdictions held by competing powers. The Archduke Ferdinand Charles held the Landgraviate of Upper Alsace, while a relative held the Landvogtei (bailiwick) of Hagenau with a protectorate over the Décapole (a league of ten imperial cities).

== Landgraves ==
The landgraviate was owned by the 'landgrave of Upper Alsace', which was always a member of the House of Habsburg from 1324 by inheritance.

The first landgrave of the area was Werner II, Count of Habsburg, and was succeeded by his family. The last landgrave was Ferdinand Charles, Archduke of Austria.

== See also ==
- Upper Rhine
- University of Upper Alsace

== Sources ==
- Arnold, Benjamin (1991). Princes and Territories in Medieval Germany. Cambridge University Press.
- Beller, E. A. (1970). "The Thirty Years War". In Cooper, J. P. (ed.). The New Cambridge Modern History, Volume 4: The Decline of Spain and the Thirty Years War, 1609–48/49. Cambridge University Press.
- Bischoff, Georges (2020). Landgraviat (in French).
- Croxton, Derek (2013). Westphalia: The Last Christian Peace. Palgrave MacMillan.
- Kaeppelin, Charles E. R, and Mary L. Hendee. Alsace Throughout the Ages. Franklin, Pa: C. Miller, 1908.
- Putnam, Ruth. Alsace and Lorraine: From Cæsar to Kaiser, 58 B.C.–1871 A.D. New York: 1915.
- Fürderer, Bettina (2012). Bündniskonstellationen am Oberrhein im 14: Jahrhundert aus Straßburger Perspektive [Urban Leagues and Space at the End of the Middle Ages] (in German). Translated by Laurence, Buchholzer-Remy; Olivier, Richard. Strasbourg, Republic of France: Strasbourg University Press. ISBN 979-1034404513.
- Dubler, Anne-Marie (1842). Dictionary of dates, facts, places and historical men or the tables of history (in French). Paris, France: Alphonse Levavasseur and Co.
- Vaughan, Richard (1973). Charles the Bold: The Last Valois Duke of Burgundy. Longman.
- Viton de Saint-Allais, Nicolas (1819). The Art of verifying the dates of historical facts, charters, chronicles and other ancient monuments, since the birth of Our Lord (in French). Paris, France: Valade.
- Vogler, Bernard (2003). New history of Alsace: a region at the heart of Europe (in French). Tolouse, Republic of France. ISBN 978-2708947764.
