= House of Habsburg =

European dynastic family

- Germanic imperial house
- Ancestral arms of the Habsburgs

- Arms of the Habsburgs as rulers of Austria
- Parent house: House of Eticho (disputed)
- Country: List: Holy Roman Empire; Habsburg monarchy; Archduchy of Austria; Kingdom of Hungary; Kingdom of Croatia; Kingdom of Bohemia; Kingdom of Galicia and Lodomeria; Iberian Union; Crown of Castile; Crown of Aragon; Kingdom of Portugal; Low Countries; Kingdom of Naples; Kingdom of Sicily; Second Mexican Empire; Kingdom of England (Note: Jure uxoris.); Kingdom of Ireland; Miscellaneous historical states
- Etymology: Habsburg Castle
- Origin: Aargau, Switzerland
- Founded: 11th century
- Founder: Radbot of Klettgau
- Current head: Karl von Habsburg-Lothringen(cognatic)
- Final ruler: Maria Theresa (agnatic); Charles I of Austria (cognatic)
- Titles: List: Holy Roman Emperor; Emperor of Austria; Emperor of Mexico; Emperor of Brazil; King of the Romans; King of Germany; King of Spain; King of Italy; King of Castile; King of Aragon; King of Valencia; King of Mallorca; King of León; King of Bulgaria; King of Sicily; King of Naples; King of Navarre; King of Hungary; King of Jerusalem (Note: Titular claim rather than de facto.); King of Bohemia; King of Croatia; King of Dalmatia; King of Slavonia; King of Illyria; King of Poland (Note: Contested.); King of Portugal; King of Galicia and Lodomeria; King of Jaén; King of England; King of Ireland; King of New Mexico; King of the Indies; King of Serbia; King of the East and West Indies; King of Chile (Note: Title given to Philip II by his father, Charles V, prior to his marriage with Mary of England. This was to ensure that Philip would not be outranked by his wife.); King of France; Archduke of Austria; Royal Prince of Belgium (Note: Through Archduke Lorenz of Austria-Este.); Grand Duke of Lithuania; Grand Prince of Transylvania; Prince of Swabia; Duke of Austria; Duke of Burgundy; Duke of Guelders; Duke of Luxembourg; Duke of Parma and Piacenza; Duke of Modena and Reggio; Duke of Milan; Duke of Lothier; Duke of Brabant; Duke of Limburg; Duke of Gelderland; Duke of Styria; Duke of Carniola; Duke of Württemberg; Duke of Carinthia; Duke of Anjou; Duke of Alençon; Duke of Angoulème; Duke of Aquitaine; Duke of Berry; Duke of Bourbon; Duke of Brittany; Duke of Braganza; Duke of Bukovina; Duke of Calabria; Duke of Châtellerault; Duke of Durazzo; Duke of Enghien; Duke of Lorraine; Duke of Lucca; Duke of Montpensier; Duke of Nemours; Duke of Normandy; Duke of Orléans; Duke of Parma; Duke of Slavonia; Duke of Touraine; Duke of Vendôme; Margrave of Namur; Margrave of Moravia; Marquis of Oristano; Marquis of Goceano; Margrave of Antwerp; Landgrave of Alsace; Count of Artois; Count of Holland; Count of Flanders; Count of Klettgau; Count of Thurgau; Count of Onertau; Count of Altemburg; Count of Hainaut; Count of Charolais; Count of Zeeland; Count of Zutphen; Count of Barcelona; Count of Roussillon; Count of Cerdanya; Count of Kyburg; Count of Haut-Rhin; Count of Goriza; Count of Namur; Count of Covadonga; Count of Girona; Count of Osona; Count of Besalú; Count of Anjou; Count of Champagne; Count of Chartres; Count of Clermont; Count of Dreux; Count of Étampes; Count of Eu; Count of Évreux; Count of Gravina; Count of La Marche; Count of Longueville; Count of Montpensier; Count of Mortain; Count of Nevers; Count of Perche; Count of Poitiers; Count of Provence; Count of Soissons; Count of Toulouse; Count of Valois; Count of Vendôme; Count of Vermandois; Count of Vertus; Count of Habsburg; Count Palatine of Burgundy; Lord of Biscay; Lord of Mechelen; Lord of Molina; Miscellaneous historical titles
- Motto: A.E.I.O.U. and Viribus Unitis
- Estates: Hofburg (formal seat); Prague Castle (formal seat); Habsburg Castle (ancestral)
- Dissolution: 1780 (in agnatic line after death of Maria Theresa)
- Cadet branches: agnatic: (all are extinct): Habsburg-Spain; Habsburg-Laufenburg; Habsburg-Kyburg; cognatic: Habsburg-Lorraine; Habsburg-Este; Habsburg-Tuscany; Habsburg-Hohenberg

The House of Habsburg (/ˈhæpsbɜːrɡ/; German: Haus Habsburg, lit. 'House of the Hawk's Fortress' [haʊs ˈhaːbsbʊrɡ]), also known as the House of Austria, (Note: German: Haus Österreich [haʊs ˈøːstɐraɪç]; Spanish: Casa de Austria [ˈkasa ðe ˈawstɾja]; Dutch: Huis van Oostenrijk [ˈɦœys fɑn ˈoːstə(n)rɛik]; Polish: Dom Austrii; Latin: Domus Austriæ; French: Maison d'Autriche; Hungarian: Ausztria Háza; Italian: Casa d'Austria; Portuguese: Casa da Áustria; Picard: Majon d'Autrique) is a European noble family that was one of the most powerful dynasties of the second millennium. They were best known for ruling vast realms throughout Europe and the Americas during the Middle Ages and early modern period, including the Holy Roman Empire, the Habsburg monarchy and Spain, as well as their inbreeding.

The house takes its name from Habsburg Castle, a Swabian fortress built in the 1020s in present-day Switzerland by Radbot of Klettgau, who named his fortress Habsburg. His grandson Otto II was the first to take the fortress name as his own, adding "Count of Habsburg" to his title. In 1273, Count Radbot's seventh-generation descendant, Rudolph, was elected King of the Romans. Taking advantage of the extinction of the Babenbergs and of his victory over Ottokar II of Bohemia at the Battle on the Marchfeld in 1278, he appointed his sons as Dukes of Austria and moved the family's power base to Vienna, where the Habsburg dynasty gained the name of "House of Austria" and ruled until 1918.

The throne of the Holy Roman Empire was continuously occupied by the Habsburgs from 1440 until their extinction in the male line in 1740, and, as the Habsburg-Lorraines from 1765 until its dissolution in 1806. The dissolution resulted from a combination of factors, chief among them Napoleon's military victories in Germany. The empire's authority had steadily weakened, while political fragmentation among the German states further eroded central control. Economic strains and intensifying regional rivalries compounded these challenges, ultimately destabilizing the Holy Roman Empire. The house also produced kings of Bohemia, Hungary, Croatia, Slavonia, Dalmatia, Spain, Portugal, Sicily, Lombardy-Venetia and Galicia-Lodomeria, with their respective colonies; rulers of several principalities in the Low Countries and Italy; numerous prince-bishoprics in the Holy Roman Empire, and in the 19th century, emperors of Austria and of Austria-Hungary, as well as one emperor of Mexico. The family split several times into parallel branches, most consequentially in the mid-16th century between its Spanish and German-Austrian branches following the abdication of Emperor Charles V in 1556. Although they ruled distinct territories, the different branches nevertheless maintained close relations and frequently intermarried.

Members of the Habsburg family oversee the Austrian branch of the Order of the Golden Fleece, the Order of the Starry Cross and the Imperial and Royal Order of Saint George. The current head of the family is Karl von Habsburg.

== Name ==
The origins of Habsburg Castle's name are uncertain. There is disagreement on whether the name is derived from the High German Habichtsburg (hawk castle), or from the Middle High German word hab/hap meaning literally ford, as there is a river with a ford nearby. The first documented use of the name by the dynasty itself has been traced to the year 1108.

The Habsburg name was not continuously used by the family members, since they often emphasized their more prestigious princely titles. The dynasty was thus long known as the "House of Austria". Complementary, in some circumstances the family members were identified by their place of birth. Charles V was known in his youth after his birthplace as Charles of Ghent. When he became king of Spain he was known as Charles of Spain, and after he was elected emperor, as Charles V (in French, Charles Quint).

In Spain, the dynasty was known as the Casa de Austria, including illegitimate sons such as John of Austria and John Joseph of Austria. The arms displayed in their simplest form were those of Austria, which the Habsburgs had made their own, at times impaled with the arms of the Duchy of Burgundy (ancient). After Maria Theresa married Duke Francis Stephen of Lorraine, the idea of "Habsburg" as associated with ancestral Austrian rulership was used to show that the old dynasty continued as did all its inherited rights. Some younger sons who had no prospects of the throne were given the personal title of "count of Habsburg".

The surname of more recent members of the family such as Otto von Habsburg and Karl von Habsburg is taken to be "von Habsburg" or more completely "von Habsburg-Lothringen". Princes and members of the house use the tripartite arms adopted in the 18th century by Francis Stephen.

The name of the dynasty is sometimes spelled in English publications as Hapsburg.

== History ==
=== Counts of Habsburg ===
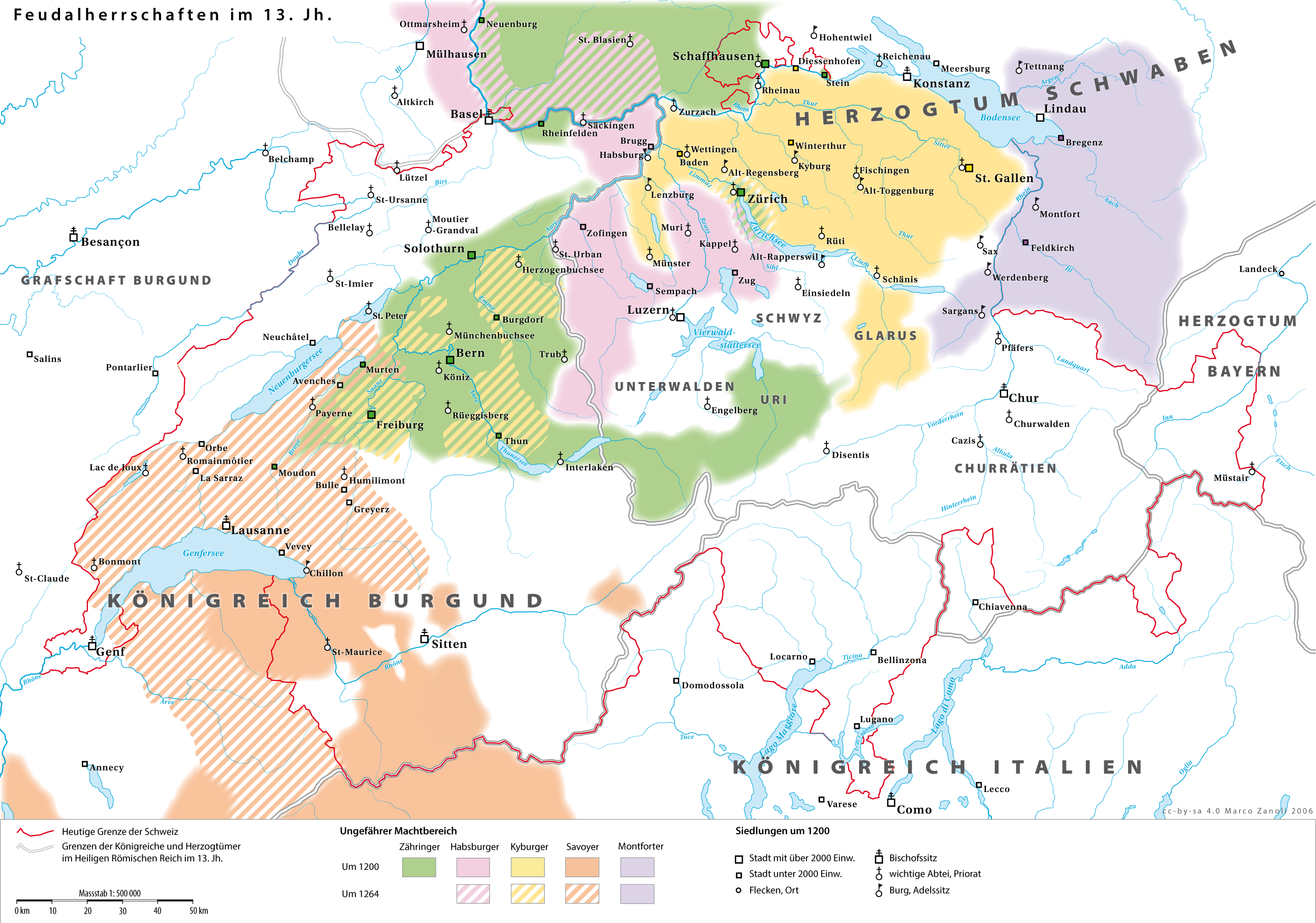
The Habsburg dominions around 1200 in the area of modern-day Switzerland are shown as Habsburg, among the houses of Savoy, Zähringer and Kyburg

The progenitor of the House of Habsburg may have been Guntram the Rich, a count in the Breisgau who lived in the 10th century, and forthwith farther back as the medieval Adalrich, Duke of Alsace, from the Etichonids from which Habsburg derives. His grandson Radbot of Klettgau founded the Habsburg Castle.

That castle was the family seat during most of the 11th, 12th and 13th centuries. Giovanni Thomas Marnavich in his book "Regiae Sanctitatis Illyricanae Faecunditas" dedicated to Ferdinand III, wrote that the House of Habsburg is descended from the Roman emperor Constantine the Great, a claim common in ruling dynasties at the time.

In the 12th century, the Habsburgs became increasingly associated with the Staufer emperors, participating in the imperial court and the emperor's military expeditions; Werner II, Count of Habsburg died fighting for Emperor Frederick I Barbarossa in Italy. This association helped them to inherit many domains as the Staufers caused the extinction of many dynasties, to which some of the Habsburgs were heirs. In 1198, Rudolf II, Count of Habsburg fully dedicated the dynasty to the Staufer cause by joining the Ghibellines and funded the Staufer emperor Frederick II's war for the throne in 1211. The emperor was made godfather to his newly born grandson, the future King Rudolf.

The Habsburgs expanded their influence through arranged marriages and by gaining political privileges, especially countship rights in Zürichgau, Aargau and Thurgau. In the 13th century, the house aimed its marriage policy at families in Upper Alsace and Swabia. They were also able to gain high positions in the church hierarchy for their members. Territorially, they often profited from the extinction of other noble families such as the House of Kyburg.

=== Pivot to Eastern Alpine Duchies ===
By the second half of the 13th century, Count Rudolph I (1218–1291) had become an influential territorial lord in the area between the Vosges Mountains and Lake Constance. On 1 October 1273, he was elected as a compromise candidate as King of the Romans and received the name Rudolf I of Germany. He then led a coalition against King Ottokar II of Bohemia who had taken advantage of the Great Interregnum in order to expand southwards, taking over the respective inheritances of the Babenberg (Austria, Styria, Savinja) and of the Spanheim (Carinthia and Carniola). In 1278, Rudolph and his allies defeated and killed Ottokar at the Battle of Marchfeld, and the lands he had acquired reverted to the German crown. With the Georgenberg Pact of 1286, Rudolph secured for his family the duchies of Austria and Styria. The southern portions of Ottokar's former realm, Carinthia, Carniola, and Savinja, went to Rudolph's allies from the House of Gorizia.

Following Rudolph's death in 1291, Albert I's assassination in 1308, and Frederick the Fair's failure to secure the German/Imperial crown for himself, the Habsburgs temporarily lost their supremacy in the Empire. In the early 14th century, they also focused on the Kingdom of Bohemia. After Václav III's death on 4 August 1306, there were no male heirs remaining in the Přemyslid dynasty. Habsburg scion Rudolph I was then elected but only lasted a year. The Bohemian kingship was an elected position, and the Habsburgs were only able to secure it on a hereditary basis much later in 1626, following their reconquest of the Czech lands during the Thirty Years' War. After 1307, subsequent Habsburg attempts to gain the Bohemian crown were frustrated first by Henry of Bohemia (a member of the House of Gorizia) and then by the House of Luxembourg.

Instead, they were able to expand southwards: in 1311, they took over Savinja; after the death of Henry in 1335, they assumed power in Carniola and Carinthia; and in 1369, they succeeded his daughter Margaret in Tyrol. After the death of Albert III of Gorizia in 1374, they gained a foothold at Pazin in central Istria, followed by Trieste in 1382. Meanwhile, the original home territories of the Habsburgs in what is now Switzerland, including the Aargau with Habsburg Castle, were lost in the 14th century to the expanding Swiss Confederacy after the battles of Morgarten (1315) and Sempach (1386). Habsburg Castle itself was finally lost to the Swiss in 1415.

=== Albertinian / Leopoldian split and Imperial elections ===
Map showing the constituent lands of the Archduchy of Austria: the Duchy of Austria, comprising Austria above the Enns centered on Linz, and Austria below the Enns centered on Vienna (modern Upper and Lower Austria respectively); Inner Austria, centered on Graz, comprising the duchies of Styria, Carinthia and Carniola, and the lands of the Austrian Littoral; and Upper Austria (not to be confused with the modern state) comprising the County of Tyrol and scattered possessions of Further Austria – mostly the Sundgau territory with the town of Belfort in southern Alsace and the adjacent Breisgau region east of the Rhine. The area between Upper Austria (Tyrol) and the Duchy of Austria was the Prince-Archbishopric of Salzburg.

Rudolf IV's brothers Albert III and Leopold III ignored his efforts to preserve the integrity of the family domains and enacted the separation of the so-called Albertinian and Leopoldian family lines on 25 September 1379 by the Treaty of Neuberg. The former would maintain Austria proper (then called Niederösterreich but comprising modern Lower Austria and most of Upper Austria), while the latter would rule over lands then labeled Oberösterreich ('Upper Austria'; distinct from the modern state), namely Inner Austria (Innerösterreich) comprising Styria, Carinthia and Carniola, and Further Austria (Vorderösterreich) consisting of Tyrol and the western Habsburg lands in Alsace and Swabia.

By marrying Elisabeth of Luxembourg, the daughter of Emperor Sigismund, in 1437 Duke Albert V of the Albertine line (1397–1439) became the ruler of Bohemia and Hungary, again expanding the family's political horizons. The next year Albert was crowned King of the Romans, known as such as Albert II. Following his early death in a battle against the Ottomans in 1439 and that of his son Ladislaus Postumus in 1457, the Habsburgs lost Bohemia once more as well as Hungary for several decades. However, with the extinction of the House of Celje in 1456 and the House of Wallsee-Enns in 1466/1483, they managed to absorb significant secular enclaves into their territories and create a contiguous domain stretching from the border with Bohemia to the Adriatic Sea.

After the death of Leopold's eldest son, William, in 1406, the Leopoldian line was further split among his brothers into the Inner Austrian territory under Ernest the Iron and a Tyrolean/Upper Austrian line under Frederick of the Empty Pockets. In 1440 Ernest's son Frederick III was chosen by the electoral college to succeed Albert II as the king. Several Habsburg kings had attempted to gain the imperial dignity over the years, but success finally arrived on 19 March 1452, when Pope Nicholas V crowned Frederick III as the Holy Roman Emperor in a grand ceremony held in Rome. In Frederick III the Pope found an important political ally with whose help he was able to counter the conciliar movement.

While in Rome, Frederick III married Eleanor of Portugal, enabling him to build a network of connections with dynasties in the west and southeast of Europe. Frederick was rather distant to his family; Eleanor, by contrast, had a great influence on the raising and education of Frederick's children and therefore played an important role in the family's rise to prominence. After Frederick III's coronation, the Habsburgs were able to hold the imperial throne almost continuously until 1806.

=== Archdukes ===
Through the forged document called privilegium maius (1358/59), Rudolf IV, Duke of Austria (1339–1365) introduced the title of Archduke to place the Habsburgs on a par with the Prince-electors of the Empire, since Emperor Charles IV had omitted to give them the electoral dignity in his Golden Bull of 1356. Charles, however, refused to recognize the title, as did his immediate successors.

Duke Ernest the Iron and his descendants unilaterally assumed the title "archduke". That title was only officially recognized in 1453 by Emperor Frederick III, the ruler of Austria himself. Frederick himself used just "Duke of Austria", never Archduke, until his death in 1493. The title was first granted to Frederick's younger brother, Albert VI of Austria (died 1463), who used it at least from 1458. In 1477, Frederick granted the title archduke to his first cousin Sigismund of Austria, ruler of Further Austria. Frederick's son and heir, the future Maximilian I, Holy Roman Emperor, apparently only started to use the title after the death of his wife Mary of Burgundy in 1482, as Archduke never appears in documents issued jointly by Maximilian and Mary as rulers in the Low Countries (where Maximilian is still titled "Duke of Austria"). The title appears first in documents issued under the joint rule of Maximilian and Philip (his under-age son) in the Low Countries.

Archduke was initially borne by those dynasts who ruled a Habsburg territory, i.e., only by males and their consorts, appanages being commonly distributed to Cadets. These "junior" archdukes did not thereby become independent hereditary rulers, since all territories remained vested in the Austrian crown. Occasionally a territory might be combined with a separate gubernatorial mandate ruled by an archducal cadet. From the 16th century onward, archduke and its female form, archduchess, came to be used by all the members of the House of Habsburg (e.g., Queen Marie Antoinette of France was born Archduchess Maria Antonia of Austria).

Habsburg lands, c.1526

=== Reunification and expansion ===
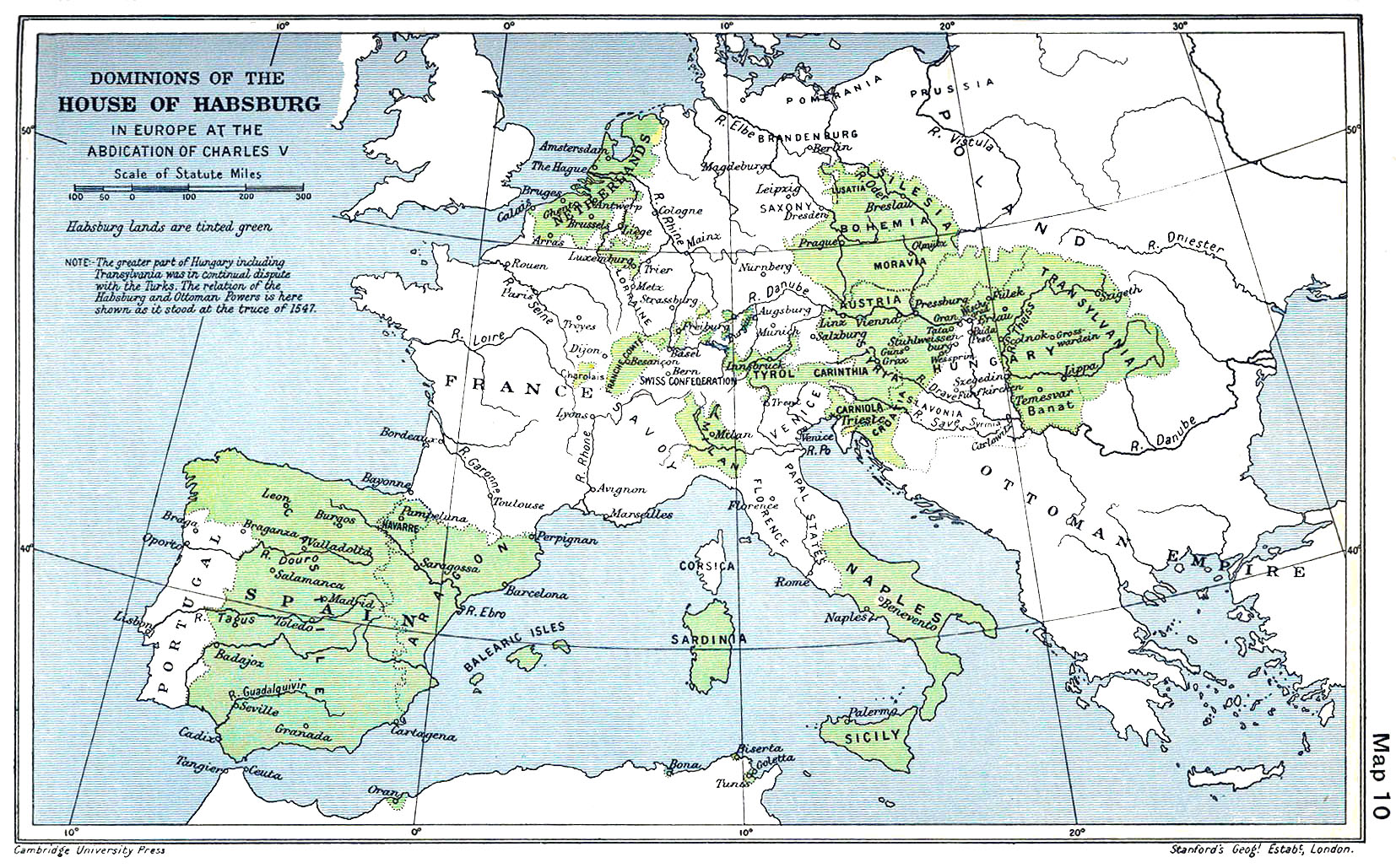
Habsburg lands (in green), following the Battle of Mühlberg in 1547; excludes the Holy Roman Empire, and the Spanish colonial empire

In 1457 Duke Frederick V of Inner Austria also gained the Austrian archduchy after his Albertine cousin Ladislaus the Posthumous had died without issue. 1490 saw the reunification of all Habsburg lines when Archduke Sigismund of Further Austria and Tyrol resigned in favor of Frederick's son Maximilian I.

As emperor, Frederick III took a leading role in the family and positioned himself as the judge over the family's internal conflicts, often making use of the privilegium maius. He was able to restore the unity of the house's Austrian lands, since the Albertinian line was now extinct. Territorial integrity was also strengthened by the extinction of the Tyrolean branch of the Leopoldian line. Frederick's aim was to make Austria a united country stretching from the Rhine to the Mur and Leitha.

Externally, one of Frederick's main achievements was the Siege of Neuss (1474–75), in which he coerced Charles the Bold of Burgundy to give his daughter Mary of Burgundy as wife to Frederick's son Maximilian. The wedding took place on the evening of 16 August 1477, and ultimately resulted in the Habsburgs acquiring control of the Burgundian Netherlands. After Mary's early death in 1482, Maximilian attempted to secure the Burgundian inheritance for one of his and Mary's children Philip the Handsome. Charles VIII of France contested this, using both military and dynastic means, but the Burgundian succession was finally ruled in favor of Philip in the Treaty of Senlis in 1493.

After the death of his father in 1493, Maximilian was proclaimed the new King of Germany, as Maximilian I. Maximilian was initially unable to travel to Rome to receive the Imperial title from the Pope, owing to opposition from Venice and from the French who were occupying Milan, as well a refusal from the Pope owing to enemy forces being present on his territory. In 1508, Maximilian proclaimed himself to be the 'chosen Emperor', and this was also recognized by the Pope owing to changes in political alliances. This had the consequence of the Roman king automatically becoming emperor without needing the Pope's consent. Emperor Charles V would be the last to be crowned by the Pope himself, at Bologna in 1530.

Maximilian's rule (1493–1519) was a time of dramatic expansion for the Habsburgs. In 1497, Maximilian's son Philip, known as the Handsome or the Fair, married Joanna of Castile, also known as Joanna the Mad, heiress of Castile and Aragon. Philip and Joanna had six children, the eldest of whom became Emperor Charles V in 1516 and ruled the kingdoms of Castile and Aragon (including their colonies in the New World), Southern Italy, Austria and the Habsburg Netherlands with his mother and nominal co-ruler, Joanna, whom he kept under confinement.

The foundations for the later empire of Austria-Hungary were laid in 1515 by a double wedding between Louis, only son of Vladislaus II, King of Bohemia and Hungary, and Maximilian's granddaughter Mary and between her brother Archduke Ferdinand and Louis's sister Anna. The wedding was celebrated in grand style on 22 July 1515. All these children were still minors, so the wedding was formally completed in 1521. Vladislaus died on 13 March 1516, and Maximilian on 12 January 1519, but the latter's designs were ultimately successful: on Louis's death in battle in 1526 Ferdinand became king of Bohemia and Hungary.

The Habsburg dynasty achieved its highest position when Charles V was elected Holy Roman Emperor in 1519. Much of Charles's reign was dedicated to the fight against Protestantism, which led to its eradication throughout vast areas under Habsburg control.

=== Spanish and Austrian Habsburgs ===
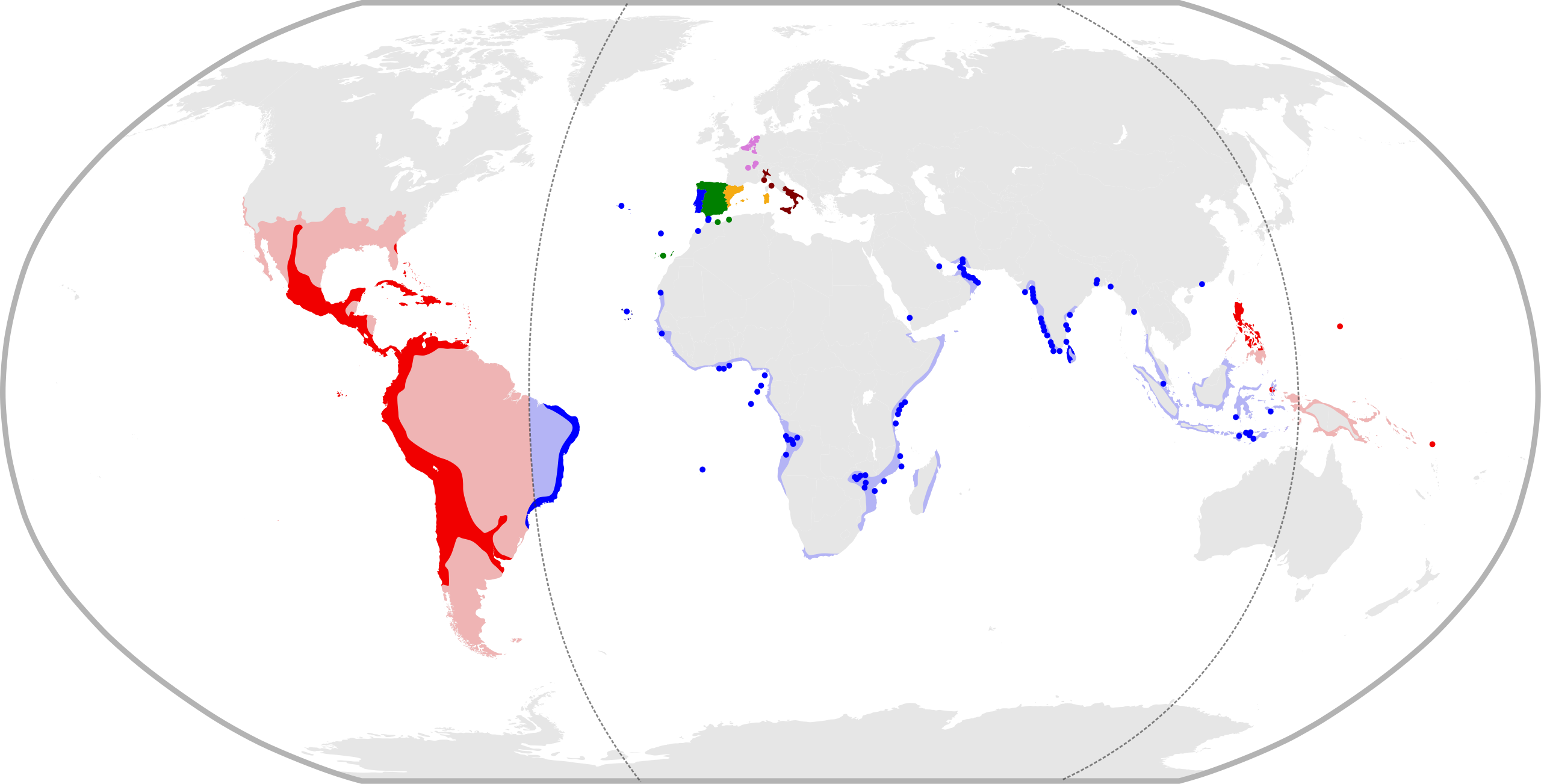
The Iberian Union in 1598, under Philip II, King of Spain and Portugal

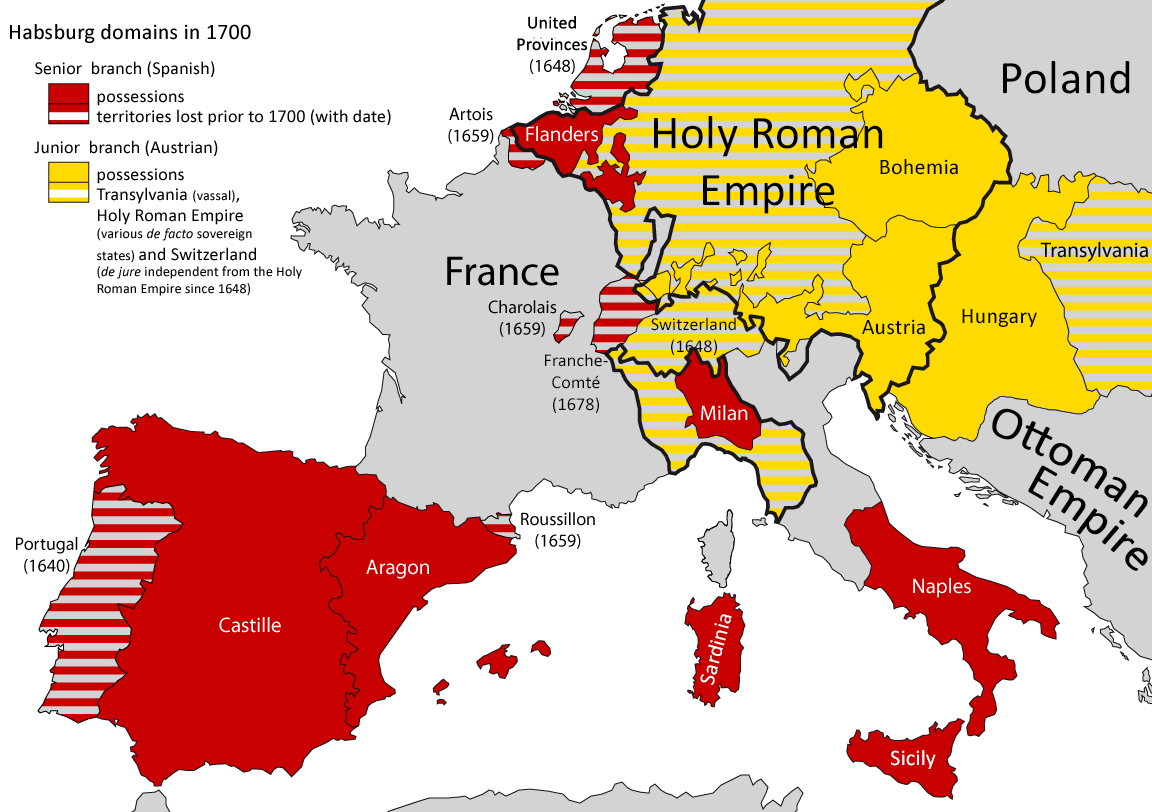
The Spanish and Austrian Habsburg European lands, ca 1700

Charles formally became the sole monarch of Spain upon the death of his imprisoned mother Queen Joan in 1555.

After the abdication of Charles V in 1556, the Habsburg dynasty split into the branch of the Austrian (or German) Habsburgs, led by Ferdinand, and the branch of the Spanish Habsburgs, initially led by Charles's son Philip.

Ferdinand I, King of Bohemia, Hungary, and archduke of Austria in the name of his brother Charles V became suo jure monarch as well as the Habsburg Holy Roman Emperor (designated as successor already in 1531). Philip became King of Spain and its colonial empire as Philip II, and ruler of the Habsburg domains in Italy and the Low Countries.

The Spanish Habsburgs also ruled Portugal for a time, known there as the Philippine dynasty (1580–1640).

The Seventeen Provinces and the Duchy of Milan were in personal union under the King of Spain but remained part of the Holy Roman Empire. Furthermore, the Spanish king had claims on Hungary and Bohemia. In the secret Oñate treaty of 29 July 1617, the Spanish and Austrian Habsburgs settled their mutual claims.

=== Habsburg inbreeding and extinction of the male lines ===
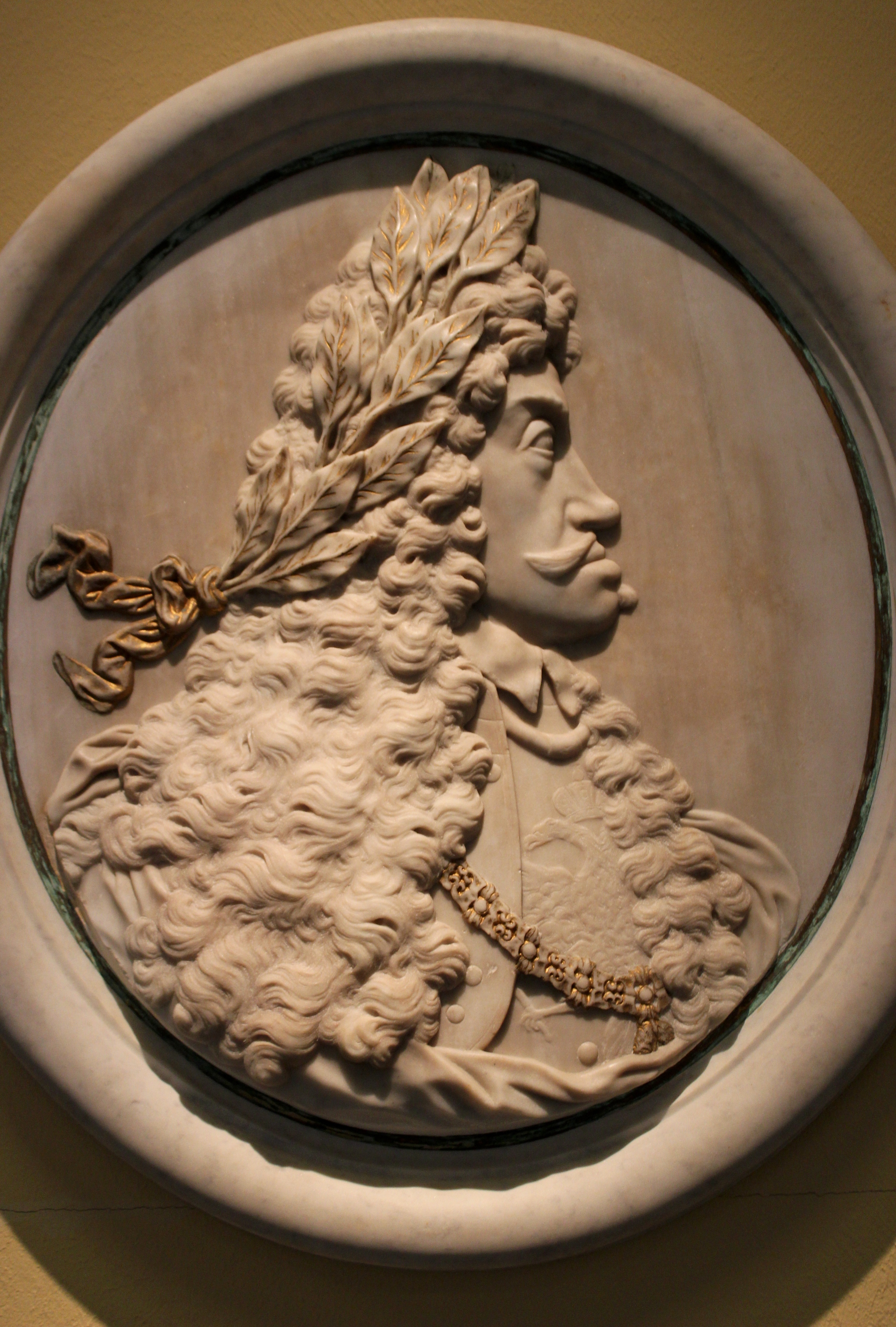
Profile portrait of Leopold I highlighting his "Habsburg jaw", Deutsches Historisches Museum

The Habsburgs sought to consolidate their power by frequent consanguineous marriages, resulting in a cumulatively deleterious effect on their gene pool. Health impairments due to inbreeding included epilepsy, insanity and early death. A study of 3,000 family members over 16 generations by the University of Santiago de Compostela suggests inbreeding may have played a role in their extinction. Numerous members of the family showed specific facial deformities: an enlarged lower jaw with an extended chin known as mandibular prognathism or 'Habsburg jaw', a large nose with hump and hanging tip ('Habsburg nose') and an everted lower lip ('Habsburg lip'). The last two are signs of maxillary deficiency. A 2019 study found that the degree of mandibular prognathism in the Habsburg family shows a statistically significant correlation with the degree of inbreeding. A correlation between maxillary deficiency and degree of inbreeding was also present but was not statistically significant. Other scientific studies, however, dispute the ideas of any linkage between fertility and consanguinity.

The gene pool eventually became so small that the last of the Spanish line, Charles II, who was severely disabled from birth (perhaps by genetic disorders), possessed a genome comparable to that of a child born to a brother and sister, as did his father, probably because of 'remote inbreeding'.

The death of Charles II of Spain in 1700 led to the War of the Spanish Succession, and that of Emperor Charles VI in 1740 to the War of the Austrian Succession. The former was won by House of Bourbon, putting an end to Habsburg rule in Spain. The latter, however, was won by Maria Theresa and led to the succession of the House of Habsburg-Lorraine (German: Haus Habsburg-Lothringen) becoming the new main branch of the dynasty in the person of Maria Theresa's son, Joseph II. This new House was created by the marriage between Maria Theresa and Francis Stephan, Duke of Lorraine. (Both of them were great-grandchildren of Habsburg emperor Ferdinand III, but from different empresses.) This new House was a cadet branch of the female line of the House of Habsburg and the male line of the House of Lorraine.

=== House of Habsburg-Lorraine ===
Austria-Hungary in 1915
Kingdoms and countries of Austria-Hungary:
Cisleithania (Empire of Austria): 1. Bohemia, 2. Bukovina, 3. Carinthia, 4. Carniola, 5. Dalmatia, 6. Galicia, 7. Küstenland, 8. Lower Austria, 9. Moravia, 10. Salzburg, 11. Silesia, 12. Styria, 13. Tyrol, 14. Upper Austria, 15. Vorarlberg;
Transleithania (Kingdom of Hungary): 16. Hungary proper 17. Croatia-Slavonia; 18. Bosnia and Herzegovina (Austro-Hungarian condominium)

On 6 August 1806, Emperor Francis I dissolved the Holy Roman Empire under pressure from Napoleon's reorganization of Germany. In anticipation of the loss of his title of Holy Roman Emperor, Francis had declared himself hereditary Emperor of Austria (as Francis I) on 11 August 1804, three months after Napoleon had declared himself Emperor of the French on 18 May 1804.

Emperor Francis I of Austria used the official full list of titles: "We, Francis the First, by the grace of God, Emperor of Austria; King of Jerusalem, Hungary, Bohemia, Dalmatia, Croatia, Slavonia, Galicia and Lodomeria; Archduke of Austria; Duke of Lorraine, Salzburg, Würzburg, Franconia, Styria, Carinthia, and Carniola; Grand Duke of Kraków; Grand Prince of Transylvania; Margrave of Moravia; Duke of Sandomir, Masovia, Lublin, Upper and Lower Silesia, Auschwitz and Zator, Teschen, and Friule; Prince of Berchtesgaden and Mergentheim; Princely Count of Habsburg, Gorizia and Gradisca and of the Tyrol; and Margrave of Upper and Lower Lusatia and Istria".

The Austro-Hungarian Compromise of 1867 created a real union, whereby the Kingdom of Hungary was granted co-equality with the Empire of Austria, that henceforth did not include the Kingdom of Hungary as a crownland. The Austrian and the Hungarian lands became independent entities enjoying equal status. Under this arrangement, the Hungarians referred to their ruler as king and never emperor (see k. u. k.). This prevailed until the Habsburgs' deposition from both Austria and Hungary in 1918 following defeat in World War I.

An ethno-linguistic map of Austria–Hungary, 1910

On 11 November 1918, with his empire collapsing around him, the last Habsburg ruler, Charles I of Austria (who also reigned as Charles IV of Hungary) issued a proclamation recognizing Austria's right to determine the future of the state and renouncing any role in state affairs. Two days later, he issued a separate proclamation for Hungary. Even though he did not officially abdicate, this is considered the end of the Habsburg dynasty.

In 1919, the new republican Austrian government subsequently passed a law banishing the Habsburgs from Austrian territory until they renounced all intentions of regaining the throne and accepted the status of private citizens. Charles made several attempts to regain the throne of Hungary, and in 1921 the Hungarian government passed a law that revoked Charles' rights and dethroned the Habsburgs, although Hungary remained a kingdom, albeit without a king, until 1946. The Habsburgs did not formally abandon all hope of returning to power until Otto von Habsburg, the eldest son of Charles I, on 31 May 1961 renounced all claims to the throne.

In the interwar period, the House of Habsburg was a vehement opponent of Nazism and Communism. In Germany, Adolf Hitler diametrically opposed the centuries-old Habsburg principles of largely allowing local communities under their rule to maintain traditional ethnic, religious and language practices, and he bristled with hatred against the Habsburg family. During the Second World War there was a strong Habsburg resistance movement in Central Europe, which was radically persecuted by the Nazis and the Gestapo. The unofficial leader of these groups was Otto von Habsburg, who campaigned against the Nazis and for a free Central Europe in France and the United States. Most of the resistance fighters, such as Heinrich Maier, who successfully passed on production sites and plans for V-2 rockets, Tiger tanks and aircraft to the Allies, were executed. The Habsburg family played a leading role in the fall of the Iron Curtain and the collapse of the Communist Eastern Bloc.

== Multilingualism ==
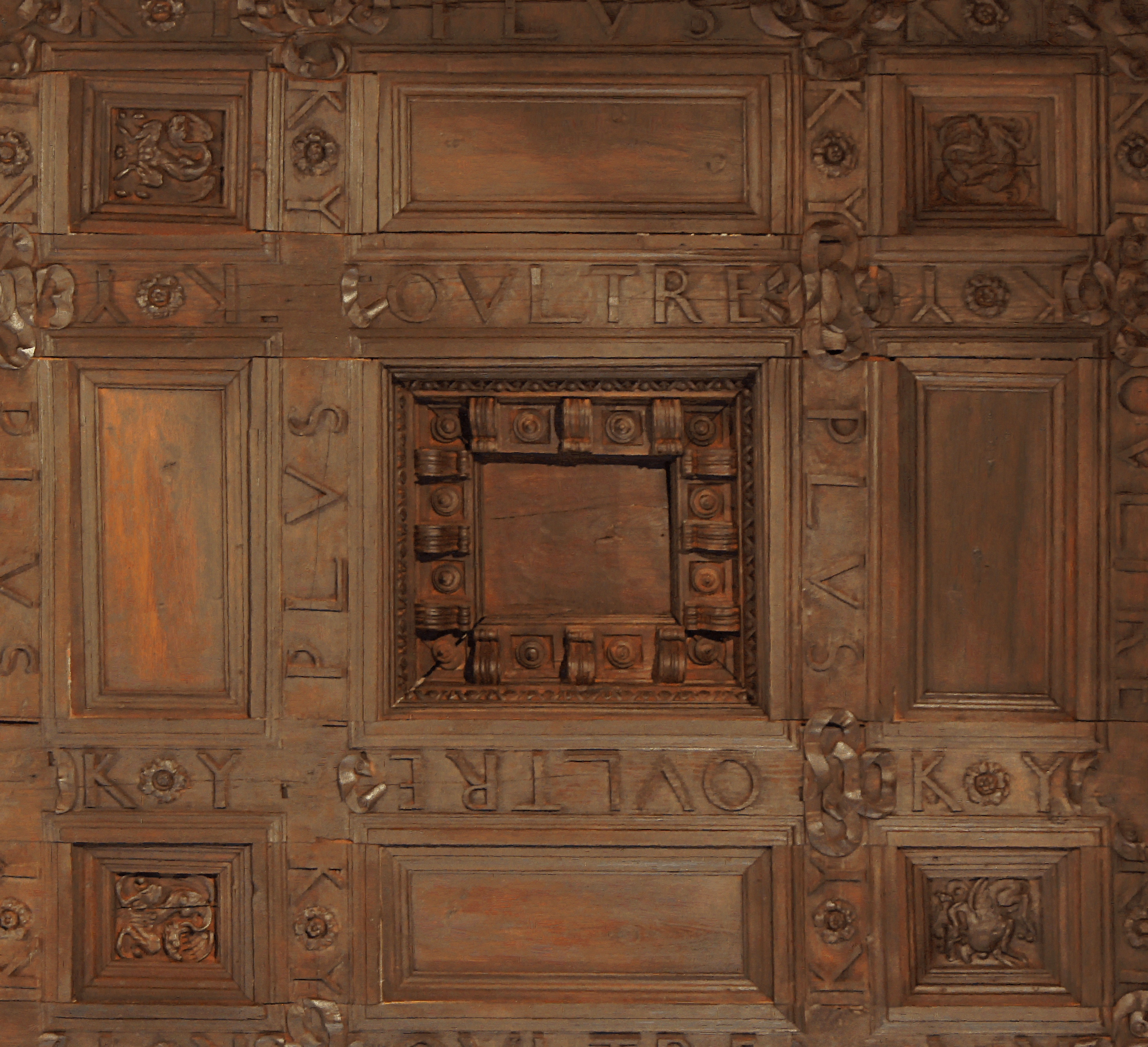
"PLUS OULTRE", motto of Charles V in French, on a ceiling of the Palace of Charles V in Granada

As they accumulated crowns and titles, the Habsburgs developed a family tradition of multilingualism that evolved over the centuries. The Holy Roman Empire had been multilingual from the start, even though most of its emperors were native German speakers. The language issue within the Empire became gradually more salient as the non-religious use of Latin declined and that of national languages gained prominence during the High Middle Ages.

Emperor Charles IV of Luxembourg was known to be fluent in Czech, French, German, Italian and Latin. The last section of his Golden Bull of 1356 specifies that the Empire's secular prince-electors "should be instructed in the varieties of the different dialects and languages" and that "since they are expected in all likelihood to have naturally acquired the German language, and to have been taught it from their infancy, [they] shall be instructed in the grammar of the Italian and Slavic tongues, beginning with the seventh year of their age so that, before the fourteenth year of their age, they may be learned in the same". In the early 15th century, Strasbourg-based chronicler Jakob Twinger von Königshofen asserted that Charlemagne had mastered six languages, even though he had a preference for German.

In the early years of the family's ascendancy, neither Rudolf I nor Albert I appears to have spoken French. By contrast, Charles V of Habsburg is well known as having been fluent in several languages. He was a native speaker of French and also knew Dutch from his youth in Flanders. He later added some Castilian Spanish, which he was required to learn by the Castilian Cortes Generales. He could also speak some Basque, acquired by the influence of the Basque secretaries serving in the royal court. He gained a decent command of German following the Imperial election of 1519. A witticism sometimes attributed to Charles was: "I speak Spanish/Latin [depending on the source] to God, Italian to women, French to men and German to my horse."

However, Charles's son, Philip II of Spain, only felt comfortable speaking Spanish, his first language in which he was educated in Castile, and Portuguese, his mother's language. The first language of Emperor Ferdinand I was also Spanish from his childhood in Castile, although, like his brother and unlike his nephew, he became a polyglot over the course of his life. These circumstances, combined with the influence of the Spanish Infanta Maria of Austria in Vienna and the influence that the Spanish Habsburgs generally had on the Austrian branch, led to Spanish becoming the language of courtly elites in Austria during the 16th century and even the mother tongue of the Emperor Rudolf II. There were, in any case, multilingual kings after Charles V among the Spanish Habsburgs such as Philip IV who was fluent in Latin, French, Italian, Portuguese and Catalan as well as Spanish.

Latin was the administrative language of the Empire until the aggressive promotion of German by Joseph II in the late 18th century, which was partly reversed by his successors. From the 16th century most if not all Austrian Habsburgs spoke French and Spanish as well as German and many also spoke Italian. Ferdinand I, Maximilian II and Rudolf II addressed the Bohemian Diet in Czech, even though it is not clear that they were fluent. By contrast there is little evidence that later Habsburgs in the 17th and 18th centuries spoke Czech, with the probable exception of Ferdinand III, who had several stays in Bohemia and appears to have spoken Czech while there. In the 19th century Francis I had some Czech and Ferdinand I spoke it decently.

Franz Joseph received a bilingual early education in French and German, then added Czech and Hungarian and later Italian and Polish. He also studied Latin and Greek. After the end of the Habsburg Monarchy Otto von Habsburg was fluent in English, French, German, Hungarian, Croatian, Italian, Spanish and Portuguese.

== Burials ==
- The Imperial Crypt (German: Kaisergruft), also called the Capuchin Crypt (Kapuzinergruft), is located beneath the church and monastery of the Order of the Capuchin Friars. Today, the crypt serves as the final resting place for 150 Habsburg figures.
- The Ducal Crypt (German: Herzogsgruft), founded by Duke Rudolf IV before 1363 in St. Stephen's Cathedral, served as the principal Burial site for the Habsburg family until 1576. Notable members interred here include Rudolf IV, Albert III, Albert IV, Leopold IV. Frederick III was initially laid to rest here before being moved to the High Tomb in the cathedral's southern choir. From 1564 to 1878, the crypt housed the intestines of deceased Habsburgs in urns. Maria Theresa expanded and renovated the crypt in 1754/1755, relocating the ancestors' remains into new coffins.
- The Palatinal Crypt, alternatively referred to as the Nádori kripta in Hungarian, situated within Buda Castle in Budapest, serves as the burial site for the Hungarian branch of the Habsburg dynasty. Established by Archduke Joseph, who held the title of Palatine of Hungary, the crypt accommodates the remains of 26 individuals. Significantly, it stands as one of the few interior sections of Buda Castle that withstood the destruction of World War II and remained preserved during subsequent reconstruction endeavors.

== List of Habsburg rulers ==
The Habsburgs' monarchical positions included:

- Holy Roman Emperors (intermittently from 1273 until 1806) and Roman-German kings
- Rulers of Austria (as dukes from 1278 until 1453; as archdukes from 1453 and as emperors from 1804 until 1918)
- Kings of Bohemia (1306–1307, 1437–1439, 1453–1457, 1526–1918)
- Kings of Spain (1516–1700)
- Kings of Hungary and Croatia (1526–1918)
- King of England and Ireland (1554–1558)
- Kings of Portugal (1581–1640)
- Grand princes of Transylvania (1690–1867)
- Kings of Galicia and Lodomeria (1772–1918)
- Emperor of Mexico (1864–1867)

=== Ancestors ===
- Guntram the Rich (ca. 930–985 / 990) Father of: The chronology of the Muri Abbey, burial place of the early Habsburgs, written in the 11th century, states that Guntramnus Dives (Guntram the Rich), was the ancestor of the House of Habsburg. Many historians assert this indeed makes Guntram the progenitor of the House of Habsburg. However, this account was 200 years after the fact, and much about him and the origins of the Habsburgs is uncertain. If true, as Guntram was a member of the Etichonider family, it would link the Habsburg lineage to this family.
- Lanzelin of Altenburg (died 991). Besides Radbot, below, he had sons named Rudolph I, Wernher, and Landolf.

=== Before the Albertine/Leopoldine division ===
==== Counts ====
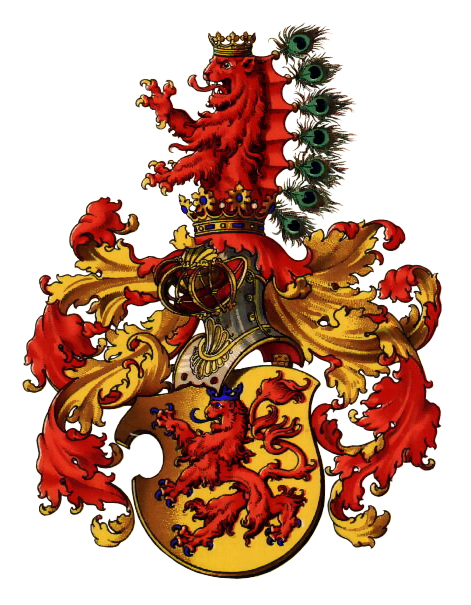
The original arms of the Counts of Habsburg

Before Rudolph rose to German king, the Habsburgs were Counts of Baden in what is today southwestern Germany and Switzerland.

- Radbot of Klettgau, built the Habsburg Castle (c. 985 – 1035). Besides Werner I, he had two other sons: Otto I, who would become Count of Sundgau in the Alsace, and Albrecht I. Founded the Muri Abbey, which became the first burial place of members of the House of Habsburg. It is possible that Radbot founded the castle Habichtsburg, the residence of the House of Habsburg, but another possible founder is Werner I.
- Rudolf of Altenburg (died 1063/4), count, founder of Ottmarsheim Abbey
- Werner I, Count of Habsburg (1025/1030–1096). Besides Otto II, there was another son, Albert II, who was reeve of Muri from 1111 to 1141 after the death of Otto II.
- Otto II of Habsburg; first to name himself as "of Habsburg" (died 1111) Father of:
- Werner II of Habsburg (around 1135; died 1167) Father of:
- Albrecht III of Habsburg (the Rich), died 1199. Under him, the Habsburg territories expanded to cover most of what is today the German-speaking part of Switzerland. Father of:
- Rudolph II of Habsburg (b. c. 1160, died 1232) Father of:
- Albrecht IV of Habsburg, (died 1239 / 1240); father of Rudolph IV of Habsburg, who would later become king Rudolf I of Germany. Between Albrecht IV and his brother Rudolph III, the Habsburg properties were split, with Albrecht keeping the Aargau and the western parts, the eastern parts going to Rudolph III. Albrecht IV was also a mutual ancestor of Sophia Chotek and of her husband Archduke Franz Ferdinand of Austria

==== Kings of the Romans ====
- Rudolph I, emperor 1273–1291
- Albert I, emperor 1298–1308

==== King of Bohemia ====
- Rudolph I, king of Bohemia 1306–1307

==== Dukes/Archdukes of Austria ====
- Rudolph II, son of Rudolph I, duke of Austria and Styria together with his brother 1282–1283, was dispossessed by his brother, who eventually would be murdered by one of Rudolph's sons.
- Albert I (Albrecht I), son of Rudolph I and brother of the above, duke from 1282 to 1308; was Holy Roman Emperor from 1298 to 1308. See also below.
- Rudolph III, the oldest son of Albert I, designated duke of Austria and Styria 1298–1307
- Frederick the Handsome (Friedrich der Schöne), brother of Rudolph III. Duke of Austria and Styria (with his brother Leopold I) from 1308 to 1330; officially co-regent of the emperor Louis IV since 1325, but never ruled.
- Leopold I, brother of the above, duke of Austria and Styria from 1308 to 1326.
- Albert II (Albrecht II), brother of the above, duke of Further Austria from 1326 to 1358, duke of Austria and Styria 1330–1358, duke of Carinthia after 1335.
- Otto the Jolly (der Fröhliche), brother of the above, duke of Austria and Styria 1330–1339 (together with his brother), duke of Carinthia after 1335.
- Rudolph IV the Founder (der Stifter), oldest son of Albert II. Duke of Austria and Styria 1358–1365, Duke of Tirol after 1363.

=== Division of Albertinian and Leopoldian lines ===
After the death of Rudolph IV, his brothers Albert III and Leopold III ruled the Habsburg possessions together from 1365 until 1379, when they split the territories in the Treaty of Neuberg, Albert keeping the Duchy of Austria and Leopold ruling over Styria, Carinthia, Carniola, the Windic March, Tirol, and Further Austria.

==== Kings of the Romans and Holy Roman Emperors (Albertinian line) ====
- Albert II, emperor 1438–1439 (never crowned)
- Frederick III, emperor 1440–1493

==== Kings of Hungary and Bohemia (Albertinian line) ====
- Albert, king of Hungary and Bohemia (1437–1439)
- Ladislaus V Posthumus, king of Hungary (1444–1457) and Bohemia (1453–1457)

==== Dukes of Austria (Albertinian line) ====
- Albert III (Albrecht III), duke of Austria until 1395, from 1386 (after the death of Leopold) until 1395 also ruled over the latter's possessions.
- Albert IV (Albrecht IV), duke of Austria 1395–1404, in conflict with Leopold IV.
- Albert V (Albrecht V), duke of Austria 1404–1439, Holy Roman Emperor from 1438 to 1439 as Albert II. See also below.
- Ladislaus Posthumus, son of the above, duke of Austria 1440–1457.

==== Dukes of Styria, Carinthia, Tyrol / Inner Austria (Leopoldian line) ====
- Leopold III, duke of Styria, Carinthia, Tyrol, and Further Austria until 1386, when he was killed in the Battle of Sempach.
- William (Wilhelm), son of the above, 1386–1406 duke in Inner Austria (Carinthia, Styria)
- Leopold IV, son of Leopold III, 1391 regent of Further Austria, 1395–1402 duke of Tyrol, after 1404 also duke of Austria, 1406–1411 duke of Inner Austria

===== Leopoldian-Inner Austrian sub-line =====
- Ernest the Iron (der Eiserne), 1406–1424 duke of Inner Austria, until 1411 together and competing with his brother Leopold IV.
- Frederick V (Friedrich), son of Ernst, became emperor Frederick III in 1440. He was duke of Inner Austria from 1424 on. Guardian of Sigismund 1439–1446 and of Ladislaus Posthumus 1440–1452. See also below.
- Albert VI (Albrecht VI), brother of the above, 1446–1463 regent of Further Austria, duke of Austria 1458–1463
- Ernestine line of Saxon princes, ancestor of George I of Great Britain-descended from sister of Frederick III; also Prince Frederick Charles of Hesse King of Finland 1918

===== Leopoldian-Tyrol sub-line =====
- Frederick IV (Friedrich), brother of Ernst, 1402–1439 duke of Tyrol and Further Austria
- Sigismund, also spelled Siegmund or Sigmund, 1439–1446 under the tutelage of the Frederick V above, then duke of Tyrol, and after the death of Albrecht VI in 1463 also duke of Further Austria.

=== Reunited Habsburgs until extinction of agnatic lines ===
Sigismund had no children and adopted Maximilian I, son of Emperor Frederick III. Under Maximilian, the possessions of the Habsburgs would be united again under one ruler, after he had re-conquered the Duchy of Austria after the death of Matthias Corvinus, who resided in Vienna and styled himself duke of Austria from 1485 to 1490.

==== Holy Roman Emperors, Archdukes of Austria ====
- Maximilian I, emperor 1508–1519
- Charles V, emperor 1519–1556, his arms are explained in an article about them

The abdications of Charles V in 1556 ended his formal authority over Ferdinand and made him suo jure ruler in Austria, Bohemia, Hungary, as well as Holy Roman Emperor.

- Ferdinand I, emperor 1556–1564 (→Family Tree)
- Maximilian II, emperor 1564–1576
- Rudolf II, emperor 1576–1612
- Matthias, emperor 1612–1619

Ferdinand's inheritance had been split in 1564 among his children, with Maximilian taking the Imperial crown and his younger brother Archduke Charles II ruling over Inner Austria (i.e. the Duchy of Styria, the Duchy of Carniola with March of Istria, the Duchy of Carinthia, the Princely County of Gorizia and Gradisca, and the Imperial City of Trieste, ruled from Graz). Charles's son and successor Ferdinand II in 1619 became Archduke of Austria and Holy Roman Emperor as well as King of Bohemia and Hungary in 1620. The Further Austrian/Tyrolean line of Ferdinand's brother Archduke Leopold V survived until the death of his son Sigismund Francis in 1665, whereafter their territories ultimately returned to common control with the other Austrian Habsburg lands.

- Ferdinand II, emperor 1619–1637
- Ferdinand III, emperor 1637–1657 (→Family Tree)
- Leopold I, emperor 1658–1705
- Joseph I, emperor 1705–1711
- Charles VI, emperor 1711–1740
- Maria Theresa, Habsburg heiress and wife of Emperor Francis I Stephen, reigned as Archduchess of Austria and Queen of Hungary and Bohemia 1740–1780.

==== Kings of Spain, Kings of Portugal (Spanish Habsburgs) ====
Habsburg Spain was a personal union between the Crowns of Castile and Aragon; Aragon was itself divided into the Kingdoms of Aragon, Catalonia, Valencia, Majorca, Naples, Sicily (including Malta) and Sardinia. From 1581, they were kings of Portugal until they renounced this title in the 1668 Treaty of Lisbon. They were also Dukes of Milan, Lord of the Americas, and holder of multiple titles from territories within the Habsburg Netherlands. A full listing can be seen here.. In Spain and Spanish history the house is known as the Casa de Austria (House of Austria). Hence the illegitimate children were known as "de Austria", e.g. Don Juan de Austria.

- Philip I of Castile the Handsome, first son of Maximilian I, founded the Spanish Habsburgs in 1496 by marrying Joanna the Mad, daughter of Ferdinand and Isabella. Philip died in 1506, leaving the thrones of Castile and Aragon to be inherited by his son:
- Charles I 1516–1556, aka Charles V, Holy Roman Emperor; divided the House into Austrian and Spanish lines The meanings of his arms are analyzed here.
- Philip II the Prudent 1556–1598, also Philip I of Portugal 1581–1598 and Philip I of England with his wife Mary I of England 1554–1558. The meanings of his arms are analyzed here. .
- Philip III the Pious also Philip II of Portugal 1598–1621
- Philip IV the Great 1621–1665, also Philip III of Portugal 1621–1640
- Charles II the Bewitched ("El Hechizado") 1665–1700

The War of the Spanish Succession took place after the extinction of the Spanish Habsburg line, to determine the inheritance of Charles II.

==== Kings of Hungary (Austrian Habsburgs) ====
- Ferdinand I, king of Hungary 1526–1564
- Maximilian I, king of Hungary 1563–1576
- Rudolf I, king of Hungary 1572–1608
- Matthias II, king of Hungary 1608–1619
- Ferdinand II, king of Hungary 1618–1637
- Ferdinand III, king of Hungary 1625–1657
- Ferdinand IV, king of Hungary 1647–1654
- Leopold I, king of Hungary 1655–1705
- Joseph I, king of Hungary 1687–1711
- Charles III, king of Hungary 1711–1740
- Maria Theresa, queen of Hungary 1741–1780

==== Kings of Bohemia (Austrian Habsburgs) ====
- Ferdinand I, king of Bohemia 1526–1564
- Maximilian I, king of Bohemia 1563–1576
- Rudolph II, king of Bohemia 1572–1611
- Matthias, king of Bohemia 1611–1618
- Ferdinand II, king of Bohemia 1620–1637
- Ferdinand III, king of Bohemia 1625/37–1657
- Ferdinand IV, king of Bohemia 1647–1654 (joint rule)
- Leopold I, king of Bohemia 1655–1705
- Joseph I, king of Bohemia 1687–1711
- Charles II, king of Bohemia 1711–1740
- Maria Theresa, queen of Bohemia 1743–1780

==== Titular Dukes of Burgundy, Lords of the Netherlands ====
Charles the Bold controlled the widespread lands of the Burgundian State. Frederick III managed to secure the marriage of Charles's only daughter, Mary of Burgundy, to his son Maximilian. The wedding took place on the evening of 16 August 1477, after the death of Charles. Mary and the Habsburgs lost the Duchy of Burgundy to France, but managed to defend and hold onto the rest what became the 17 provinces of the Habsburg Netherlands. After Mary's death in 1482, Maximilian acted as regent for his son Philip the Handsome.

- Philip the Handsome (1482–1506)
- Charles V (1506–1555)
- Margaret of Austria, Duchess of Savoy, regent (1507–1515) and (1519–1530)
- Mary of Hungary, dowager queen of Hungary, sister of Charles V, governor of the Netherlands, 1531–1555
- Margaret of Parma, illegitimate daughter of Charles V, Duchess of Parma, and mother of Alexander Farnese, Duke of Parma, governor 1559–1567
- Don John of Austria, illegitimate son of Charles V, victor of Lepanto, governor of the Netherlands, 1576–1578
- Alexander Farnese, Duke of Parma, son of Margaret of Parma, governor of the Netherlands, 1578–1592

The Netherlands was frequently governed directly by a regent or governor-general, who was a collateral member of the Habsburgs. By the Pragmatic Sanction of 1549 Charles V combined the Netherlands into one administrative unit, to be inherited by his son Philip II. Charles effectively united the Netherlands as one entity. The Habsburgs controlled the 17 Provinces of the Netherlands until the Dutch Revolt in the second half of the 16th century, when they lost the seven northern Protestant provinces. They held onto the southern Catholic part (roughly modern Belgium and Luxembourg) as the Spanish and Austrian Netherlands until they were conquered by the French Revolutionary Army in 1795. The one exception to this was the period of (1601–1621), when shortly before Philip II died on 13 September 1598, he renounced his rights to the Netherlands in favor of his daughter Isabella and her fiancé, Archduke Albert of Austria, a younger son of Emperor Maximilian II. The territories reverted to Spain on the death of Albert in 1621, as the couple had no surviving offspring, and Isabella acted as regent-governor until her death in 1633:

- the Archdukes Albert and Isabella, 1601–1621

=== Habsburg-Lorraine ===
The War of the Austrian Succession took place after the extinction of the male line of the Austrian Habsburg line upon the death of Charles VI. The direct Habsburg line itself became totally extinct with the death of Maria Theresa of Austria, when it was followed by the House of Habsburg-Lorraine.

==== Holy Roman Emperors, Kings of Hungary and Bohemia, Archdukes of Austria (House of Habsburg-Lorraine, main line) ====
- Francis I Stephen, emperor 1745–1765 (→Family Tree)
- Joseph II, emperor 1765–1790
- Leopold II, emperor 1790–1792 (→Family Tree)
- Francis II, emperor 1792–1806 (→Family Tree)

Queen Maria Christina of Austria of Spain, great-granddaughter of Leopold II, Holy Roman Emperor above. Wife of Alfonso XII of Spain and mother of Alfonso XIII of the House of Bourbon. Alfonso XIII's wife Victoria Eugenie of Battenberg was descended from King George I of Great Britain from the Habsburg Leopold Line {above}.

The House of Habsburg-Lorraine retained Austria and attached possessions after the dissolution of the Holy Roman Empire; see below.

A son of Leopold II was Archduke Rainer Joseph of Austria whose wife was from the House of Savoy; a daughter Adelaide, Queen of Sardinia was the wife of King Victor Emmanuel II of Sardinia and King of Italy. Their Children married into the Royal Houses of Bonaparte; Saxe-Coburg and Gotha {Bragança} {Portugal}; Savoy {Spain}; and the Dukedoms of Montferrat and Chablis.

==== Emperors of Austria (House of Habsburg-Lorraine, main line) ====
- Francis I, Emperor of Austria 1804–1835: formerly Francis II, Holy Roman Emperor

(→Family Tree)

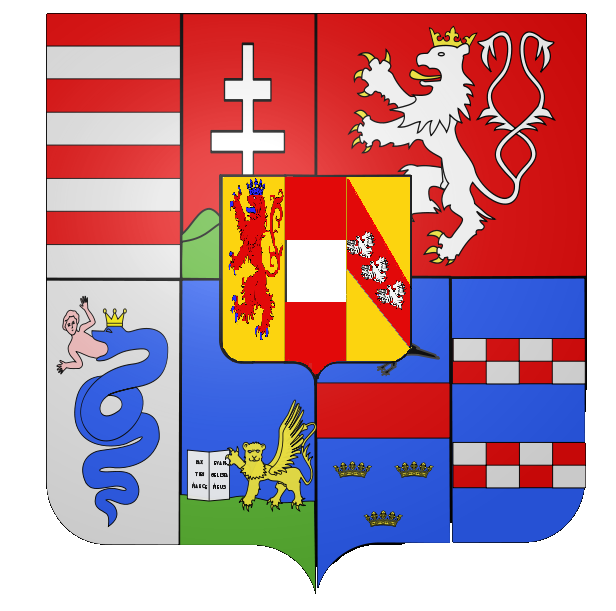
- Ferdinand I, Emperor of Austria 1835–1848
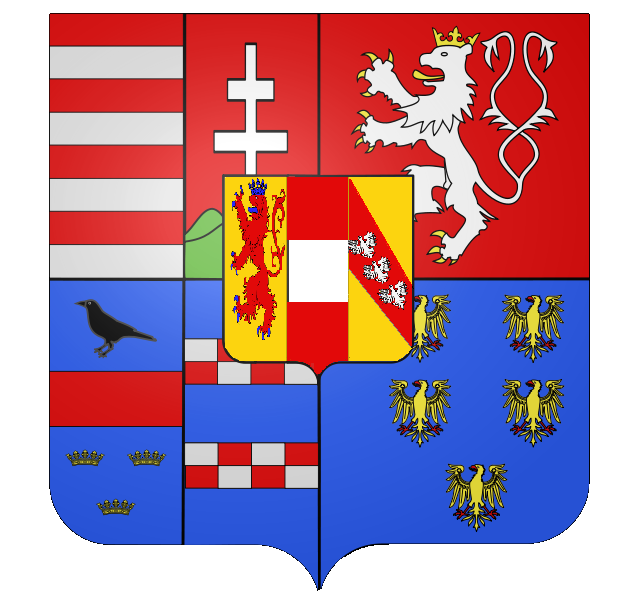
- Francis Joseph, Emperor of Austria 1848–1916.
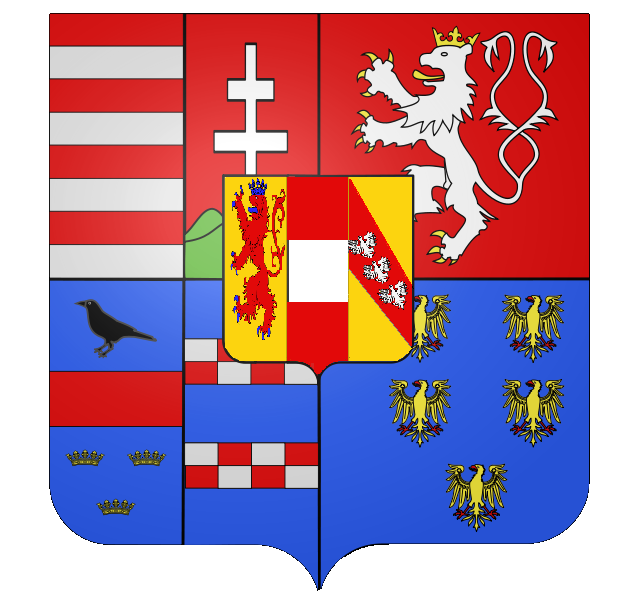
- Charles I, Emperor of Austria 1916–1918. He died in exile in 1922. His wife was of the House of Bourbon-Parma.

==== Kings of Hungary (Habsburg-Lorraine) ====
- Joseph II, king of Hungary 1780–1790
- Leopold II, king of Hungary 1790–1792
- Francis I, king of Hungary 1792–1835
- Ferdinand V, king of Hungary and Bohemia 1835–1848
- Francis Joseph I, king of Hungary 1867–1916
- Charles IV, king of Hungary 1916–1918

==== Kings of Bohemia (Habsburg-Lorraine) ====
- Joseph II, king of Bohemia 1780–1790
- Leopold II, king of Bohemia 1790–1792
- Francis I, king of Bohemia 1792–1835
- Ferdinand V, king of Bohemia 1835–1848
- Francis Joseph, king of Bohemia 1848–1916
- Charles III, king of Bohemia 1916–1918

=== Italian branches ===
==== Grand dukes of Tuscany (House of Habsburg-Lorraine) ====

- Francis Stephen 1737–1765 (later Francis I, Holy Roman Emperor)

Francis Stephen assigned the Grand Duchy of Tuscany to his second son Peter Leopold, who in turn assigned it to his second son upon his accession as Holy Roman Emperor. Tuscany remained the domain of this cadet branch of the family until Italian unification.

- Peter Leopold I 1765–1790 (later Leopold II, Holy Roman Emperor)
- Ferdinand III 1790–1800, 1814–1824 (→Family Tree)
- Leopold II 1824–1849, 1849–1859
- Ferdinand IV 1859–1860

==== Dukes of Modena (Austria-Este branch of the House of Habsburg-Lorraine) ====
The Duchy of Modena was assigned to a minor branch of the family by the Congress of Vienna. It was lost to Italian unification. The dukes named their line the House of Austria-Este, as they were descended from the daughter of the last D'Este duke of Modena.

- Francis IV 1814–1831, 1831–1846 (→Family Tree)
- Francis V 1846–1848, 1849–1859

==== Duchess of Parma (House of Habsburg-Lorraine) ====
The Duchy of Parma and Piacenza was under Habsburg rule between 1735 and 1748 before passing to the House of Bourbon-Parma. The duchy was then assigned to a Habsburg but did not stay in the House long before succumbing to Italian unification. It was granted to the second wife of Napoleon I of France, Marie Louise, Duchess of Parma, a daughter of the Francis II, Holy Roman Emperor, who was the mother of Napoleon II of France. Napoleon had divorced his wife Joséphine de Beauharnais) in her favor and the duchy was granted to her at the Congress of Vienna in 1814. Following her death in 1847 the duchy reverted to the House of Bourbon-Parma. In 1746 with the extinction of the Gonzagas of the Duchy of Guastalla this duchy passed to Parma, until with the death of Marie Louise it passed to the Duchy of Modena, therefore continuing under Habsburg rule.

- Marie Louise, Duchess of Parma 1814–1847 (→Family Tree)

=== Other monarchies ===
==== King of England ====
- Philip II of Spain (Jure uxoris King, with Mary I of England 1554–1558)

==== Empress consort of Brazil and Queen consort of Portugal (House of Habsburg-Lorraine) ====
Dona Maria Leopoldina of Austria (22 January 1797 – 11 December 1826) was an archduchess of Austria, Empress consort of Brazil and Queen consort of Portugal.

==== Empress consort of France (House of Habsburg-Lorraine) ====
- Marie Louise of Austria 1810–1814

==== Emperor of Mexico (House of Habsburg-Lorraine) ====
Coat of arms of the Mexican Empire adopted by Maximilian I in 1864

Maximilian, the adventurous second son of Archduke Franz Karl, was invited as part of Napoleon III's manipulations to take the throne of Mexico, becoming Emperor Maximilian I of Mexico. The conservative Mexican nobility, as well as the clergy, supported this Second Mexican Empire. His consort, Charlotte of Belgium, a daughter of King Leopold I of Belgium and a princess of the House of Saxe-Coburg and Gotha, encouraged her husband's acceptance of the Mexican crown and accompanied him as Empress Carlota of Mexico. The adventure did not end well. Maximilian was shot in Cerro de las Campanas, Querétaro, in 1867 by the republican forces of Benito Juárez.

- Maximilian I (1864–1867) (→Family Tree)

== List of post-monarchical Habsburgs ==
=== Main Habsburg-Lorraine line ===
Charles I was expelled from his domains after World War I and the empire was abolished.

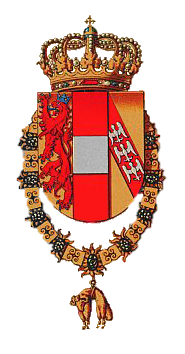
Current personal arms of the head of the house of Habsburg, claiming only the personal title of Archduke

- Charles I (1918–1922) (→Family Tree)
- Otto von Habsburg (1922–2007)
- Zita of Bourbon-Parma, guardian (1922–1930)
- Karl von Habsburg (2007–present)

=== House of Habsburg-Tuscany ===
- Ferdinand IV 1860–1908
- Archduke Joseph Ferdinand, Prince of Tuscany (1908–1942)
- Archduke Peter Ferdinand, Prince of Tuscany (1942–1948)
- Archduke Gottfried, Prince of Tuscany (1948–1984)
- Archduke Leopold Franz, Prince of Tuscany (1984–1994)
- Archduke Sigismund Otto, Grand Duke of Tuscany (1994–present)

=== House of Habsburg-Este ===
- Francis V (1859–1875)
- Franz Ferdinand, Archduke of Austria-Este & Crown Prince of Austria-Hungary (1875–1914)
- Karl, Archduke of Austria-Este (1914–1917)
- Robert, Archduke of Austria-Este (1917–1996)
- Lorenz, Archduke of Austria-Este (1996–present)

== Male-line family tree ==
House of Habsburg

Original line
Albert; Count of Habsburg c. 1188–1239
Rudolf I of Germany c. 1218–1291
Albert I of Germany; 1255–1308	Hartmann; 1263–1281	Rudolf II; Duke of Austria; 1270–1290
Rudolf I of Bohemia; 1281–1307	Frederick the Fair c. 1289–1330	Leopold I Duke of Austria; 1290–1326	Albert II; Duke of Austria; 1298–1358	Henry the Friendly; 1299–1327	Otto; Duke of Austria; 1301–1339	John; Parricida c. 1290–1312/1313
Albertinian line	Leopoldian line
Rudolf IV; Duke of Austria; 1339–1365	Frederick III; 1347–1362	Albert III; Duke of Austria; 1349–1395	Leopold III; Duke of Austria; 1351–1386	Frederick II; Duke of Austria; 1327–1344	Leopold II; Duke of Austria; 1328–1344
Albert IV; Duke of Austria; 1377–1404	William; Duke of Austria c. 1370–1406	Leopold IV; Duke of Austria; 1371–1411	Ernest; Duke of Austria; 1377–1424	Frederick IV; Duke of Austria; 1382–1439
Albert II of Germany; 1397–1439	Frederick III; HRE; 1415–1493	Albert VI; Archduke of Austria; 1418–1463	Sigismund; Archduke of Austria; 1427–1496
Ladislaus the Posthumous; 1440–1457	Maximilian I HRE; 1459–1519
Philip I of Castile; 1478–1506
Spanish / Iberian line	Austrian / HRE line
Charles V HRE; 1500–1558	Ferdinand I HRE; 1503–1564
Philip II of Spain; 1527–1598	Maximilian II; HRE; 1527–1576	Ferdinand II; Archduke of Austria; 1529–1595	Charles II; Archduke of Austria; 1540–1590
Carlos; Prince of Asturias; 1545–1568	Philip III of Spain; 1578–1621	Rudolf II; HRE; 1552–1612	Ernest of Austria; 1553–1595	Matthias; HRE; 1557–1619	Maximilian III; Archduke of Austria; 1558–1618	Albert VII; Archduke of Austria; 1559–1621	Wenceslaus; Archduke of Austria; 1561–1578	Andrew; Margrave of Burgau; 1558–1600	Charles; Margrave of Burgau; 1560–1618	Ferdinand II; HRE; 1578–1637	Maximilian Ernest of Austria; 1583–1616	Leopold V Archduke of Austria; 1586–1632	Charles of Austria; 1590–1624
Philip IV of Spain; 1605–1665	Charles of Austria; 1607–1632	Ferdinand of Austria; 1609–1641	John-Charles of Austria; 1605–1619	Ferdinand III; HRE; 1608–1657	Leopold Wilhelm of Austria; 1614–1662	Ferdinand Charles; Archduke of Austria; 1628–1662	Sigismund Francis; Archduke of Austria; 1630–1665
Balthasar Charles; Prince of Asturias; 1629–1646	Charles II of Spain; 1661–1700	Ferdinand IV; King of the Romans; 1633–1654	Leopold I HRE; 1640–1705	Charles Joseph of Austria; 1649–1664
Joseph I HRE; 1678–1711	Charles VI; HRE; 1685–1740
Lorraine
Maria Theresa; HRE; 1740–1780	Francis I HRE; 1745–1765
Habsburg-Lorraine
Joseph II; HRE; 1765–1790	Leopold II; HRE; 1790–1792
Francis II; HRE; 1792–1806

== See also ==
- A.E.I.O.U.
- Habsburg monarchy
- Habsburg Spain
- Royal intermarriage
- Habsburg family tree
- Heraldry of the House of Habsburg
- French–Habsburg rivalry
- Habsburg myth

== Sources ==
- Agamov, A. M. Dynasties of Europe 400–2016: Complete Genealogy of Sovereign Houses (in Russian). Moscow, 2017. pp. 27–33.
- Bittles, AH; Grant, JC (2002). "Does inbreeding lead to decreased human fertility?". Human Biology. 29 (2): 111–130. doi:10.1080/03014460110075657. PMID 11874619. S2CID 31317976.
- Brewer-Ward, Daniel A. The House of Habsburg: A Genealogy of the Descendants of Empress Maria Theresia. Clearfield, 1996.
- Callaghan, Clare (2019). Great Events from History, Volume I; The Renaissance & Early Modern Era. ISBN 978-1-58765-214-1.
- Cowans, Jon (2003). Modern Spain: A Documentary History. U. of Pennsylvania Press. ISBN 0-8122-1846-9.
- Crankshaw, Edward. The Fall of the House of Habsburg. Sphere Books Limited, London, 1970. (First published by Longmans in 1963.)
- Erbe, Michael (2000). Die Habsburger 1493–1918. Urban. Kohlhammer Verlag. ISBN 978-3-17-011866-9.
- Evans, R. J. W. The Making of the Habsburg Monarchy, 1550–1700: An Interpretation. Clarendon Press, 1979.
- Fichtner, Paula Sutter (1976). "Dynastic Marriage in Sixteenth-Century Habsburg Diplomacy and Statecraft: An Interdisciplinary Approach". The American Historical Review. 81 (2): 243–265. doi:10.2307/1851170. JSTOR 1851170.
- Kos, Milko (1985). Srednjeveška kultur, družbena in politična zgodovina Slovencev. Slovenska Matica.
- McGuigan, Dorothy Gies. The Habsburgs. Doubleday, 1966.
- Naumann, Karl Gottfried (1855). Genealogische geschichte der Europäischen staaten als hülfsmittel bei Historischen studien und zum Gebrauch höherer Lehranstalten. F. Mauke.
- Palmer, Alan. Napoleón and Marie Louise: The Emperor's Second Wife. St. Martin's Press, 2001.
- Rady, Martyn. The Habsburgs: To Rule the World. Basic Books, 2020.
- Wandruszka, Adam. The House of Habsburg: Six Hundred Years of a European Dynasty. Doubleday, 1964 (Greenwood Press, 1975).

— Royal house — House of Habsburg Founding year: 12th century
Preceded by Přemyslid dynasty	Ruling House of the Duchy of Austria; 1282–1453	Duchy Elevated; Became Archduchy
Preceded by House of Luxembourg	Ruling House of Holy Roman Empire; 1440–1740	Succeeded by House of Wittelsbach
New title Union of Austria and Hungary	Ruling House of Archduchy of Austria; 1453–1780	House of Habsburg-Lorraine; Extinction of direct male line
Preceded by House of Jagiellon	Ruling House of Kingdom of Hungary; 1526–1780	House of Habsburg-Lorraine; Extinction of direct male line
Preceded by House of Jagiellon	Ruling House of Kingdom of Croatia; 1527–1780	House of Habsburg-Lorraine; Extinction of direct male line
Preceded by House of Jagiellon	Ruling House of Kingdom of Bohemia; 1526–1780	House of Habsburg-Lorraine; Extinction of direct male line
Preceded by House of Aviz	Ruling House of Kingdom of Portugal and the Algarves; 1580–1640	Succeeded by House of Braganza
Preceded by House of Trastámara	Ruling House of Kingdom of Spain; 1555–1700	Succeeded by House of Bourbon
Preceded by House of Savoy	Ruling House of Kingdom of Sicily; 1720–1734	Succeeded by House of Bourbon
Preceded by House of Valois	Ruling House of the Duchy of Burgundy and the Burgundian Netherlands; 1477–1700	Succeeded by House of Bourbon
Preceded by House of Bourbon	Ruling House of Kingdom of Naples; 1713–1735	Succeeded by House of Bourbon
Preceded by House of Bourbon	Ruling House of Kingdom of Sardinia; 1516–1720	Succeeded by House of Savoy
Preceded by House of Bourbon	Ruling House of the Duchy of Burgundy and the Burgundian Netherlands; 1713–1780	Succeeded by House of Habsburg-Lorraine
