= Rudolf of Habsburg =

Rudolf of Habsburg may refer to:

- Rudolf I of Germany (1218–1291), King of the Romans
- Rudolph II, Count of Habsburg (d. 1232)
- Rudolf II, Duke of Austria (1270–1290)
- Rudolf I of Bohemia (1281–1307), Duke of Austria and Styria and King of Bohemia
- Rudolf IV, Duke of Austria (1339–1365)
- Rudolf II, Holy Roman Emperor (1552–1612), King of Hungary, King of Bohemia, Archduke of Austria and Holy Roman Emperor
- Archduke Rudolf of Austria (1788–1831), Cardinal and Archbishop of Olmütz
- Rudolf, Crown Prince of Austria (1858–1889)
