= Bilitzer von Bilitz =

Silesian noble family

Bilitzer von Bilitz (also Bielitzer von Bielitz, Latin: Bilizorus, Polish: Bilicerowie) is a Silesian noble family domiciled in Prudnik Poland.

Due to the eventful history of Silesia, their roots last from the Habsburg monarchy and House of Hohenzollern.

== History ==
The family came from the Duchy of Opole. The first known representative of the family, Mathias Bilitzer, was mentioned in the Urbarium from 1534. In the 16th and 17th centuries, the Bilitzers were based in Prudnik, Brzeg and Namysłów. On 3. April 1607 Matthias Bilitzer (1550–1616) was elevated to the nobility by Rudolf II, Count of Habsburg. They were given their family coat of arms was given to them in 1607.

== Family tree ==
1. Maciej Bilicer (born 16th century), wife: Jadwiga Wilde
  1. Maciej Bilicer (22 December 1550 in Prudnik, died 1616), wife: Rosina Heinrich (died 1634)
    1. Maciej Bilicer (1578–1620), wife: Urszula Biedermann
      1. Maciej Bilicer (1607–1672),
      2. Hans (died 1647)
    2. Adam Bilicer, Ehefrau: Helena Schmeiß von Ehrenpreisberg
      1. Zuzanna Elżbieta Bilicer (1597–1669), Legnica
      2. Eufrozyna, died 1652 in Strzelin
      3. Joachim Fryderyk Bilicer (1616–1645), Herr von Jakuszów und Grzymalin, Lieutenant Commander of the imerial Marine
    3. Fryderyk (born 1583 in Prudnik)
    4. Krzysztof (1586–1621), confidente of the House of Hohenzollern
    5. Krystyna (1592–1634), husband: Georg Schmettau (born 21 February 1585)
      1. Georg
      2. Ernst
  2. Piotr Bilicer (16th century – 17th century)
  3. Adam Bilicer, died 1646
    1. Adam Bilicer
  4. Anton Bilicer, died 1656 in Brzeg
  5. Jerzy Bilicer, mentioned 1586 in Prudnik
