= Otto II of Habsburg =

11th-century German nobleman

Otto II, Count of Habsburg
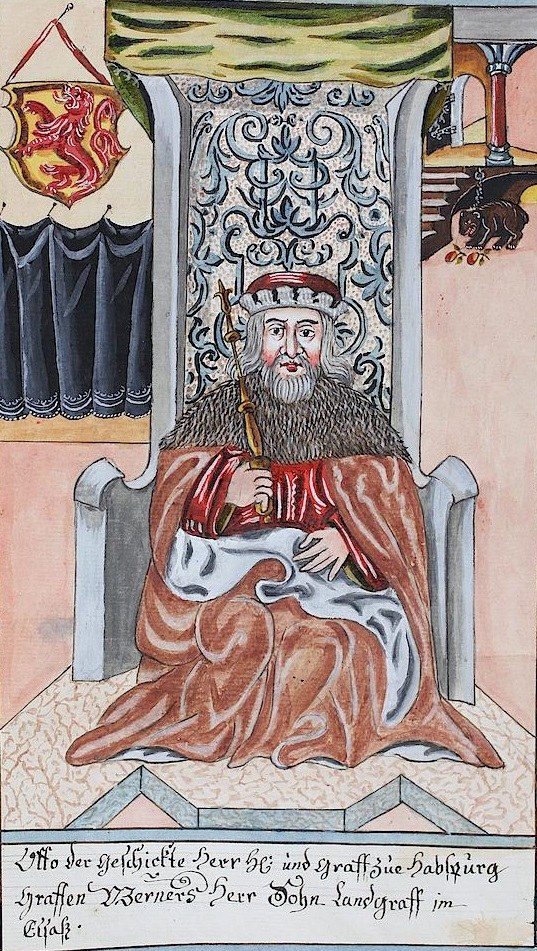
- Count of Klettgau
- Reign: 11 November 1096 – 8 November 1111
- Predecessor: Werner I, Count of Klettgau
- Successor: Werner II
- Born: Late 1050s-Early 1060s
- Died: 8 November 1111
- Noble family: House of Habsburg
- Spouse: Hilla von Pfirt
- Issue: Werner II, Adelaide, & Gertrude
- Father: Werner I, Count of Habsburg
- Mother: Reginlinde of Nellenburg

Otto II (died 8 November 1111) was a Graf (Count) of Habsburg and one of the founding members of the Habsburg family. He was the son of Werner I, Count of Habsburg. Otto II was likely born in the late 1050s or early 1060s. Otto inherited the county of Klettgau & Altembourg from his father; Werner I, Count of Habsburg.

In 1108, Otto accompanied King Henry V on a campaign against Hungary. On his return, in 1111, he was murdered. Otto is presumed to be the first person to adopt the title Graf von Habsburg.

He married Hilla, countess von Pfirt (died c. 1076), with whom he had three children including Werner II and Adelheid.

Otto II of Habsburg House of Habsburg Born: Unknown Died: 1111
Regnal titles
Preceded by Werner I	Count of Habsburg; 1096 – 1111	Succeeded by Werner II
