= Don Juan de Austria =

Don Juan de Austria may refer to:

People:

- Vimaladharmasuriya I of Kandy, king of the Kingdom of Kandy from 1590 to 1604
- John of Austria, ("Don Juan de Austria" or "Don John of Austria", 1547–1578) general and illegitimate son of Charles V, Holy Roman Emperor
- John Joseph of Austria (1629–1679), Spanish general and political figure, illegitimate son of Philip IV of Spain
- Archduke Johann of Austria (1782–1859)

Ships

- Don Juan de Austria, a Spanish Navy cruiser that fought in the Battle of Manila Bay during the Spanish–American War.

The Arts

- Don John of Austria, an opera by Isaac Nathan.
