= Werner I of Klettgau =

11th-century German nobleman

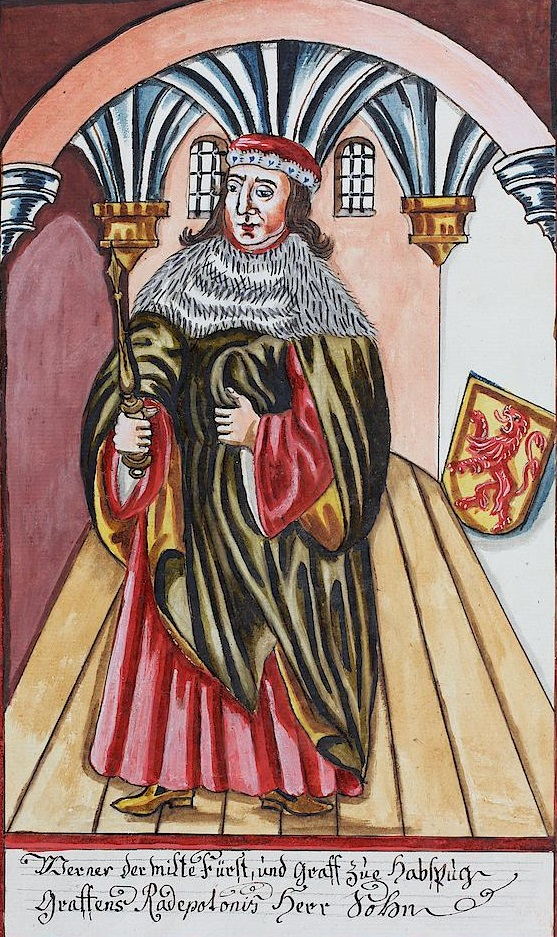
Werner I

Werner I (1030–1096), sometimes known as Werner the Pious, was a German nobleman who acted as count of Klettgau. He was an early member of the House of Habsburg and an ancestor of King Rudolph I of Germany.

His father was Radbot of Klettgau and his mother was Ita or Ida (23 July a. 979 – post 1035), daughter of Adalbert II (d. 1033), Count of Saargau and Metz of the House of Matfriede, and Judith, daughter of Conrad I of Swabia.

In 1057, Werner married Reginlinde of Nellenbourg (1027–1090). He had two sons: Otto II, and Albert II (also known as Albrecht II or Adalbert II).

Werner I of Klettgau House of Habsburg Born: 1025/1030 Died: 1096
Regnal titles
Preceded by Radbot I	Count of Klettgau; 1045–1096	Succeeded by Otto II
