= Albert III of Habsburg =

Swiss nobleman (died 1199)

Albert III, Count of Habsburg
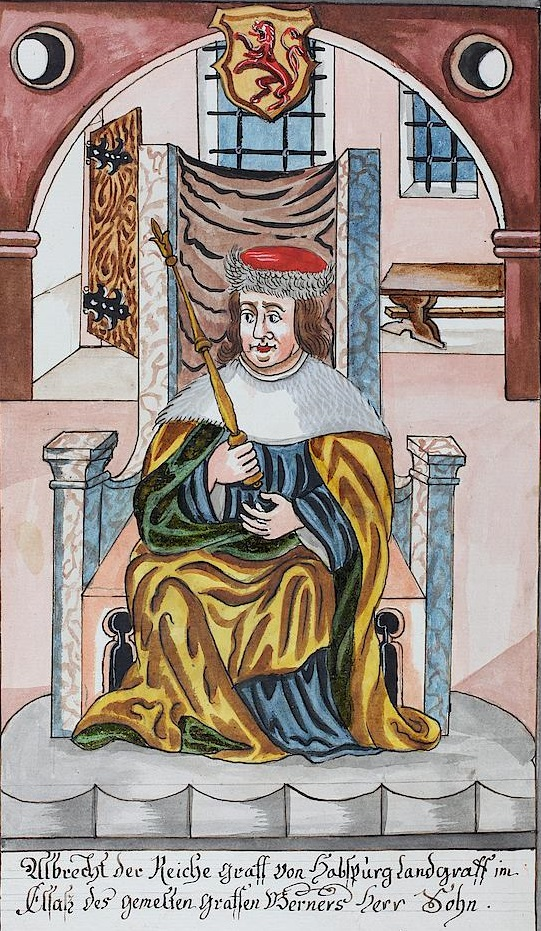
- Reign: 19 August 1167 – 25 November 1199
- Died: 25 November 1199
- Noble family: House of Habsburg
- Spouse: Ida of Pfullendorf
- Issue: Rudolph II, Count of Habsburg
- Father: Werner II, Count of Habsburg
- Mother: Ida of Homberg

Albert III (died 25 November 1199), also known as Albert the Rich, was Count of Habsburg and an early ancestor of the royal House of Habsburg.

He was the son of Count Werner II of Habsburg, whom he succeeded in 1167. His large inheritance included estates in Switzerland, Alsace and Baden. Albert married Ida, daughter of Count Rudolph of Pfullendorf and Elisabeth, daughter of Welf VI. Like his father, he was a loyal supporter of the Imperial House of Hohenstaufen.

He was the father of Count Rudolph II of Habsburg.

Albert III of Habsburg House of Habsburg Born: ? Died: 1199
Regnal titles
Preceded by Werner II	Count of Habsburg; 1167 – 1199	Succeeded by Rudolph II
