= Rudolf II, Count of Habsburg =

German nobleman (died 1232)

Rudolph II, Count of Habsburg
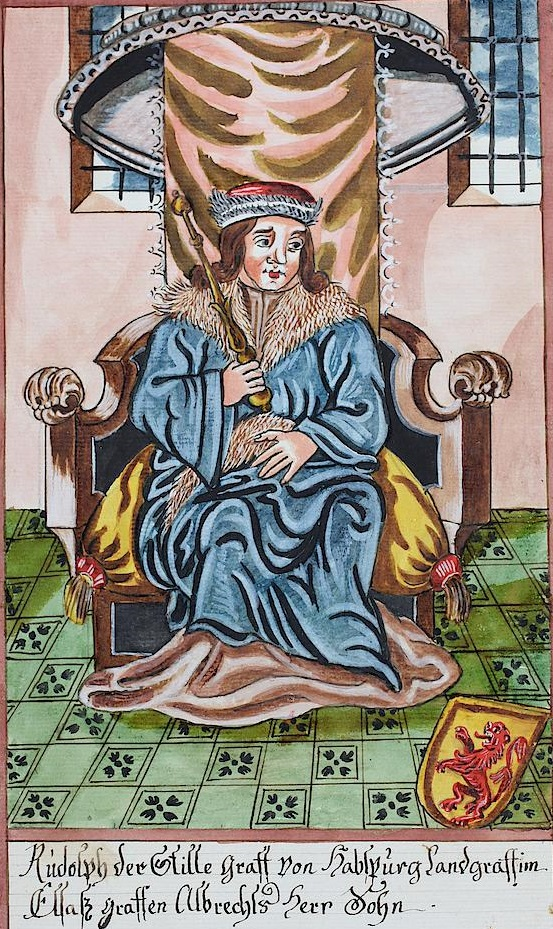
- Reign: 25 November 1199 – 10 April 1232
- Died: 10 April 1232
- Noble family: House of Habsburg
- Spouse: Agnes of Staufen
- Issue: Albert IV, Count of Habsburg; Rudolph III, Count of Habsburg
- Father: Albert III, Count of Habsburg
- Mother: Ita of Pfullendorf

Rudolph II (or Rudolph the Kind) (died 10 April 1232) was Count of Habsburg in the Aargau and a progenitor of the royal House of Habsburg.

He was the only son of Count Albert III of Habsburg and Ita of Pfullendorf. He married Agnes of Staufen. Rudolph was the father of Count Albert IV of Habsburg and Count Rudolph III of Habsburg and the grandfather of King Rudolph I of Germany.

Rudolf II, Count of Habsburg House of Habsburg Born: ? Died: 1232
Regnal titles
Preceded by Albert III	Count of Habsburg; 1199 – 1232	Succeeded by Albert IV and Rudolph III the Silent
