= Werner II of Habsburg =

Count of Hapsburg (died 1167)

Werner II, Count of Habsburg
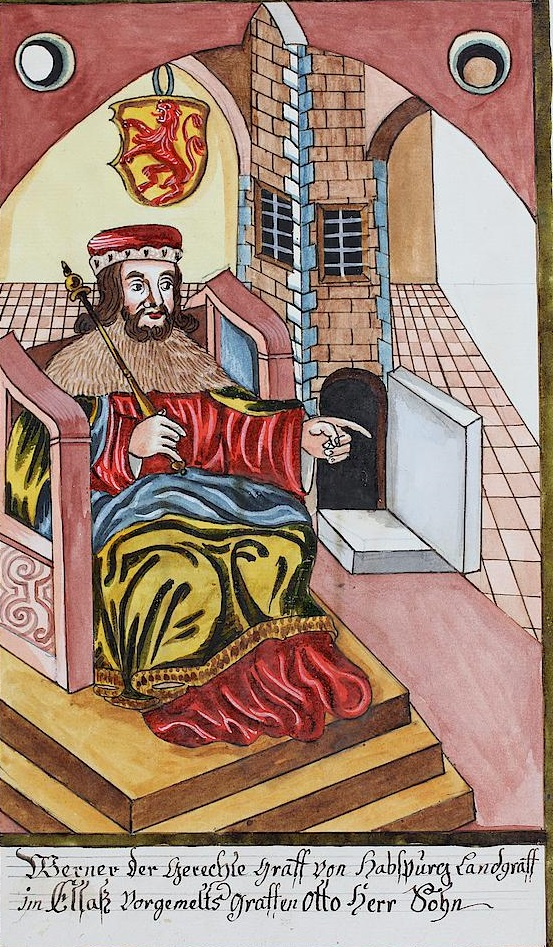
- Reign: 8 November 1111 – 19 August 1167
- Died: 19 August 1167 near Tusculum
- Noble family: House of Habsburg
- Spouse: Ida of Homberg
- Issue: Albert III, Count of Habsburg; Otto II, Bishop of Constance; Richenza von Habsburg
- Father: Otto II
- Mother: Hilla of Pfirt

Werner II of Habsburg (died 19 August 1167) was Count of Habsburg also called Werner III and a progenitor of the royal House of Habsburg. He was the great-great-grandfather of King Rudolph I of Germany.

He was the son of Count Otto II of Habsburg and Hilla of Pfirt. Werner married Ida of Homberg. He is known for having been involved in the War of Bregenz Succession of 1164 – 1166.

He died near Tusculum after the Battle of Monte Porzio.

He was the father of Count Albert III of Habsburg and Bishop Otto II of Constance (1165–1174). His daughter Richenza married Count Louis I of Pfirt.

== Sources ==
- Meier, Bruno (2013). Ein Königshaus aus der Schweiz: Die Habsburger, der Aargau und die Eidgenossenschaft im Mittelalter (in German). Hier und Jetzt Verlag für Kultur und Geschichte. ISBN 9783039197354.

Werner II of Habsburg House of Habsburg Born: ? Died: 1167
Regnal titles
Preceded by Otto II	Count of Habsburg; 1111–1167	Succeeded by Albert III
