= Jenko =

Jenko is a Slovene surname. Notable people with the surname include:

- Ana Jenko, the birth name of Ana Štěrba-Böhm, Slovene chemist
- Davorin Jenko (1835–1914), Slovene composer
- Simon Jenko (1835–1869), Slovene poet, lyricist and writer
  - Jenko Award, Slovene literary award

Fictional characters

- Greg Jenko, a character from the Jump Street franchise

== See also ==
- Eleonora Jenko Groyer (1879–1959), Slovene physician
- Jenčo
