= Heraldry of the House of Habsburg =

The coats of arms of the House of Habsburg were the heraldic emblems of their members and their territories, such as Austria-Hungary and the Austrian Empire. Historian Michel Pastoureau says that the original purpose of heraldic emblems and seals was to facilitate the exercise of power and the identification of the ruler, due to what they offered for achieving these aims. These symbols were associated with the kingdom, and eventually also represented the intangible nature of the national sentiment or sense of belonging to a territory.

A complete listing of the arms can be found at the Habsburg Armory.

== Heraldry ==

Arms of Austria impaled with Burgundy (ancient). The personal arms of most Austrian princes from 1477 until 1740 (see here)

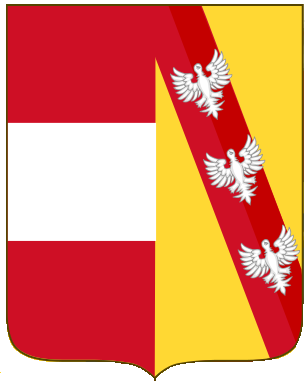

Personal Arms of Joseph II and Marie Antoinette showing Austria (Habsburg arms) impaled with Lorraine (Lorraine arms).

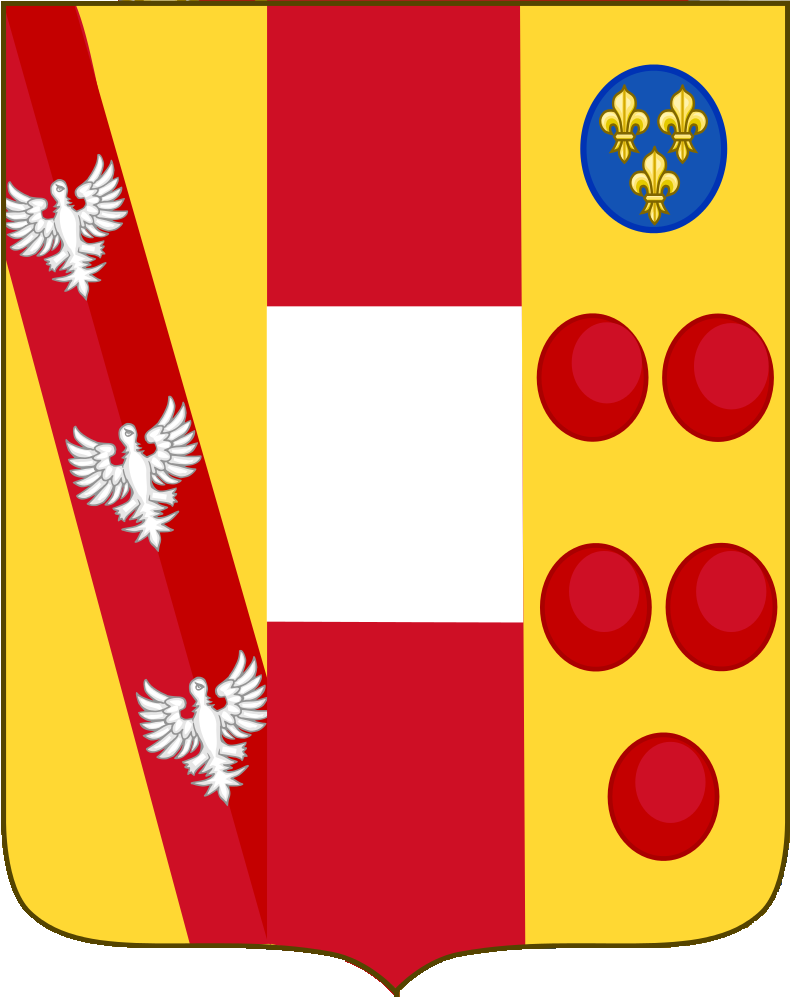

Tripartite personal arms of Leopold II and Francis II/I showing Austria (Habsburg arms), Lorraine (Lorraine arms) and Tuscany (Medici arms), and used by the House of Austria-Tuscany (see Archduke Sigismund, Grand Duke of Tuscany).

Tripartite personal arms of the "Habsburg" ruling house after 1805 showing the return to prominence of the old Habsburg arms. This was illustrate that the old dynasty continued in all its rights. It is used today by most archdukes/archduchesses.

=== Arms of Dominion of the Austro-Hungarian Empire ===
The arms of dominion began to take on their own life of in the 19th century as the idea of the state as independent from the Habsburg dynasty took root. They are the national arms borne by a sovereign in his capacity as head of state and represent the state as separate from the person of the monarch or his dynasty. That very idea had been, heretofore, foreign to the concept of the Habsburg state. The state had been the personal property of the Habsburg dynasty. Since the states, territories, and nationalities represented were in many cases only united to the Austro-Hungarian Empire by their historic loyalty to the head of the house of Habsburg as hereditary lord, these full ("grand") arms of the dominion of Austria-Hungary reflect the complex political infrastructure that was necessarily to accommodate the many nationalities and groupings within the empire after the Austro-Hungarian Compromise of 1867.

Shield of the Austrian part of the empire (1867–1915).

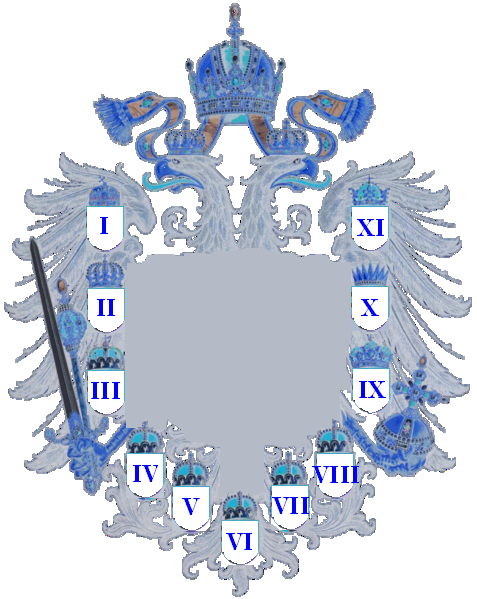
Enumeration

After 1867 the eastern part of the empire, also called Transleithania, was mostly under the domination of the Kingdom of Hungary. The shield integrated the arms of the kingdom of Hungary, with two angels and supporters and the crown of St. Stephen, along with the territories that were subject to it:

The Kingdom of Dalmatia, the Kingdom of Croatia, the Kingdom of Slavonia (conjoined with Croatia as the Kingdom of Croatia-Slavonia - formally known as the Triune Kingdom of Croatia, Slavonia, and Dalmatia, although the claim to Dalmatia was mostly de jure), the Great Principality of Transylvania, the Condominium of Bosnia and Herzegovina (1915–1918), the City of Fiume and its district (modern Rijeka), and in the center, the Kingdom of Hungary.

The western or Austrian part of the empire, Cisleithania, continued using the shield of the Empire in 1815 but with the seals of various member territories located around the central shield. Paradoxically, some of these coats of arms belonged to the territories that were part of the Hungarian part of the empire and shield. This shield, the most frequently used until 1915, was known as the middle shield. There was also the small shield, with just the personal arms of the Habsburgs, as used in 1815.

I	II	III	IV	V
Kingdom of Hungary	Kingdom of Galicia and Lodomeria	Archduchy of Austria	Duchy of Salzburg	Duchy of Styria
VI	VII		VIII	
Duchy of Tirol	Duchy of Carinthia and Duchy of Carniola (Marshalled)		Margraviate of Moravia and Duchy of Silesia (Marshalled)	
IX	X	XI		
Great Principality of Transylvania	Kingdom of Illyria	Kingdom of Bohemia		

Before 1915, the arms of the different territories of the Austrian part of the Empire (heraldry was added to some areas not shown in the previous version and to the left to the Hungarian part) appeared together in the shield positioned on the double-headed eagle coat of arms of the Austrian Empire as an inescutcheon. The eagle was inside a shield with a goldfield. The latter shield was supported by two griffins and was topped by the Austrian Imperial Crown (previously these items were included only in the large shield). Then, shown in the center of both arms of dominion, as an inescutcheon to the inescutcheon, is the small shield, i.e. personal arms, of the Habsburgs. All this was surrounded by the collar Order of the Golden Fleece.

Middle Coat of arms of the Austrian part of the Empire in 1915. It shows as a center shield (inescutcheon) the personal arms of Habsburg-Lorraine over the arms of dominions of the Habsburg lands. It usually had the personal arms of Habsburg-Lorraine in the center.

Austrian Lands
Shield	Partition	Territory
	I II; III; IV; V VI; VII; VIII; IX; X XI; XII; XIII; XIV; XV; XVI; XVII; XVIII; XIX; XX	Kingdom of Galicia and Lodomeria; Kingdom of Bohemia; Kingdom of Dalmatia; Duchy of Upper and Lower Silesia; Duchy of Salzburg; Margraviate of Moravia; County of Tirol; Duchy of Bukovina; Province of Vorarlberg; Margraviate of Istria; County of Gorizia (part of the Princely County of Gorizia and Gradisca); County of Gradisca (also part of the Princely County of Gorizia and Gradisca); Province of Bosnia and Herzegovina (Conjoined); Imperial Free City of Trieste; Archduchy of Lower Austria; Archduchy of Upper Austria; Duchy of Styria; Duchy of Carniola; Duchy of Carinthia; Archduchy of Austria

Similarly, the lands of the Crown of Hungary/St. Stephen had their own heraldic achievement:

Coat of arms of the Lands of the Holy Hungarian Crown, 1915-1918. As Hungary officially remained a Kingdom, this composition remained from 1919-1946.

Territories of the crown of St. Stephen
Shield	Partition	Territory
	I II; III; IV; V VI; VII	Kingdom of Dalmatia (Legally Hungarian); Kingdom of Croatia; Kingdom of Slavonia; Grand Principality of Transylvania; Province of Bosnia and Herzegovina (Conjoined); City of Fiume and its district Kingdom of Hungary

In 1915, in the middle of World War I, Austria-Hungary adopted a heraldic composition uniting the shield that was used in the Hungarian part, also known as the Lands of the Crown of St. Stephen, with a new version of the medium shield of the Austrian part as depicted above in the section on the mainline of the Emperors of Austria.

In the heraldic composition of 1915, the shields of the two foci of the empire, Austria and Hungary, were brought together. The griffin supporter on the left was added for Austria and an angel on the right as a supporter for Hungary. The center featured the personal arms of the Habsburgs (Habsburg, Austria, and Lorraine). This small shield was topped with a royal crown and surrounded by the collar of the Order of the Golden Fleece, below which was the Military Order of Maria Theresa, below which was the collars of the Orders of St. Stephen's and Leopold. At the bottom was the motto that read "AC INDIVISIBILITER INSEPARABILITER" ("indivisible and inseparable"). Other simplified versions did not have the supports depicted, and the simple shields of Austria and Hungary. These were the arms of the Empire of Austria with an inescutcheon of Austria, and the Arms of Hungary (with chequer of Croatia at the tip).

Middle Common Coat of Arms of the Austro-Hungarian Empire in 1915 showing most of the larger possessions of the Austrian Empire (left shield) and the Kingdom of Hungary (right shield). The personal arms of the Habsburg-Lorraine are in the center. The collection of territories that acknowledged the head of the Habsburgs as personal ruler shown by this representation put the Empire at a distinct disadvantage in comparison with the unified nation-states that it shared the continent of Europe with.

Personal Shield of the Dynasty
Shield	Partition	Significance
	I II; III	Count of Habsburg; Archduke of Austria; Duke of Lorraine

Arms of the Lands of the Crown of Saint Stephen (1867–1915)	Arms of the Lands of the Crown of Saint Stephen (1915–1918)	Small Arms of Austria (Cisleithania) (1805–1918)
Simple Arms of Cisleithania (1915–1918)	Personal Arms of the Emperor Franz Josef (1848–1916)	Simple Arms of the Austrian and Hungarian parts of the empire (1915–1918)
Personal Arms of the Emperor of Austria and King of Hungary (1916)	Arms of Otto and Karl von Habsburg	Royal coat of arms of Charles as King of Hungary (1915-1918)
