= Theodora von Hermansthal =

- Born: 1835; Ljubljana
- Died: November 13, 1918
- Occupation: Miniature painter

Theodora von Hermansthal (3 July 1835 – 13 November 1918) was a Slovenian miniature painter.

She was born in 1835 in Laibach (present day Ljubljana, Slovenia) in the Kingdom of Illyria, part of the Austrian Empire.

Von Hermansthal studied under Karl Blaas at the Venice Academy of Art. Her 1869 miniature portrait of Dorothea Schulz von Strasznitsky was included in the 1877 exhibition at the Academy of Fine Arts Vienna.
