= Julian March =

Historical region in Croatia, Italy, and Slovenia

Julian March: Venezia Giulia (Italian); Julijska krajina (Slovene); Julijska krajina (Croatian)
- Region
- The Julian March within the Kingdom of Italy (1923–1947), with its four provinces: the Province of Gorizia (blue), the Province of Trieste (green), the Province of Fiume (red), the Province of Pola (yellow)

The Julian March (Croatian and Slovene: Julijska krajina), also called Julian Venetia (Italian: Venezia Giulia; Venetian: Venesia Julia; Friulian: Vignesie Julie; Austrian German: Julisch Venetien), is an area of southern Central Europe which is currently divided among Croatia, Italy, and Slovenia. The term was coined in 1863 by the Italian linguist Graziadio Isaia Ascoli, a native of the area, to demonstrate that the Austrian Littoral, Veneto, Friuli, and Trentino (then all part of the Austrian Empire) shared a common Italian linguistic identity. Ascoli emphasized the Augustan partition of Roman Italy at the beginning of the Empire, when Venetia et Histria was Regio X (the Tenth Region).

The term was later endorsed by Italian irredentists, who sought to annex regions in which ethnic Italians made up most (or a substantial portion) of the population: the Austrian Littoral, Trentino, Fiume and Dalmatia. The Triple Entente promised the regions to Italy in the dissolution of the Austro-Hungarian Empire in exchange for Italy's joining the Allied Powers in World War I. The secret 1915 Treaty of London promised Italy territories largely inhabited by Italians (such as Trentino) in addition to those largely inhabited by Croats or Slovenes; the territories housed 421,444 Italians, and about 327,000 ethnic Slovenes.

A contemporary Italian autonomous region, bordering on Slovenia, is named Friuli-Venezia Giulia ("Friuli and Julian Venetia").

== Etymology ==
The Triveneto, or Tre Venezie, according to Graziadio Ascoli

The term "Julian March" is a partial translation of the Italian name "Venezia Giulia" (or "Julian Venetia"), coined by the Italian historical linguist Graziadio Ascoli, who was born in Gorizia. The term "March" in "Julian March" refers to a medieval European designation for a borderland or frontier district, more specifically, a buffer zone between different realms.

In an 1863 newspaper article, Ascoli focused on a wide geographical area north and east of Venice which was under Austrian rule; he called it Triveneto ("the three Venetian regions"). Ascoli divided Triveneto into three parts:

- Euganean Venetia (Venezia Euganea or Venezia propria; Venetia in the strict sense), made up of Italy's Veneto region and most of the territory of Friuli (roughly corresponding to the present Italian provinces of Udine and Pordenone)
- Tridentine Venetia (Venezia Tridentina): the present Italian region of Trentino-Alto Adige/Südtirol
- Julian Venetia (Venezia Giulia): "Gorizia, Trieste and Istria ... including the land between the Venetia in the strict sense of the term, the Julian Alps, and the sea"

According to this definition, Triveneto overlaps the ancient Roman region of Regio X – Venetia et Histria introduced by Emperor Augustus in his administrative reorganization of Italy at the beginning of the first century AD. Ascoli (who was born in Gorizia) coined his terms for linguistic and cultural reasons, saying that the languages spoken in the three areas were substantially similar. His goal was to stress to the ruling Austrian Empire the region's Latin and Venetian roots and the importance of the Italian linguistic element.

The term "Venezia Giulia" did not catch on immediately, and began to be used widely only in the first decade of the 20th century. It was used in official administrative acts by the Italian government in 1922–1923 and after 1946, when it was included in the name of the new region of Friuli-Venezia Giulia.

== History ==
=== Early Middle Ages to the Republic of Venice ===
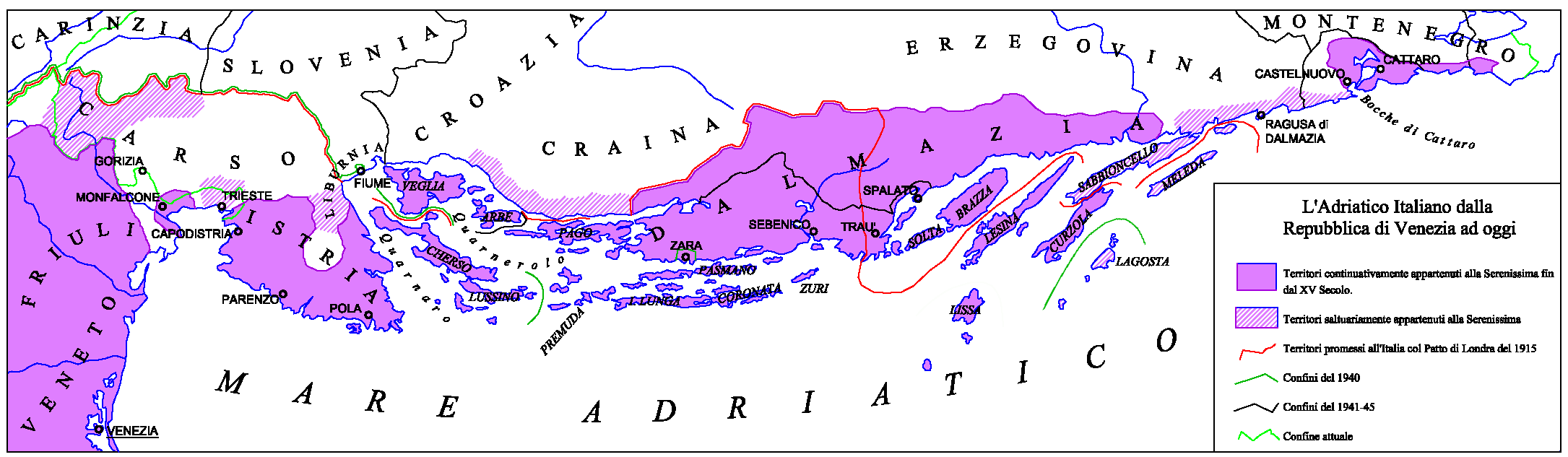
Map of Dalmatia and Istria with the boundaries set by the Treaty of London (1915) (red line) and those actually obtained from Italy (green line). The black line marks the border of the Governorate of Dalmatia (1941–1943). The ancient domains of the Republic of Venice are indicated in pink (dashed diagonally, the territories that belonged occasionally).

At the end of the Roman Empire and the beginning of the Migration Period, the area had linguistic boundaries between speakers of Latin (and its dialects) and the Germanic- and Slavic-language speakers who were moving into the region. Germanic tribes first arrived in present-day Austria and its surrounding areas between the fourth and sixth centuries. They were followed by the Slavs, who appeared on the borders of the Byzantine Empire around the sixth century and settled in the Eastern Alps between the sixth and eighth centuries. In Byzantine Dalmatia, on the east shore of the Adriatic Sea, several city-states had limited autonomy. The Slavs retained their languages in the interior, and local Romance languages (followed by Venetian and Italian) continued to be spoken on the coast.

Beginning in the early Middle Ages, two main political powers shaped the region: the Republic of Venice and the Habsburg (the dukes and, later, archdukes of Austria). During the 11th century, Venice began building an overseas empire (Stato da Màr) to establish and protect its commercial routes in the Adriatic and southeastern Mediterranean Seas. Coastal areas of Istria and Dalmazia were key parts of these routes (Note: Adriatic routes to and from Venice were based on Dalmatian and Istrian harbours, which were more easily accessible for vessels than their Italian counterparts.) since Pietro II Orseolo, the Doge of Venice, established Venetian rule in the high and middle Adriatic around 1000. The Venetian presence was concentrated on the coast, replacing Byzantine rule and confirming the political and linguistic separation between coast and interior. The Republic of Venice began expanding toward the Italian interior (Stato da Tera) in 1420, acquiring the Patriarchate of Aquileia (which included a portion of modern Friuli—the present-day provinces of Pordenone and Udine—and part of internal Istria).

The Habsburg held the March of Carniola, roughly corresponding to the central Carniolan region of present-day Slovenia (part of their holdings in Inner Austria), since 1335. During the next two centuries, they gained control of the Istrian cities of Pazin and Rijeka-Fiume, the port of Trieste (with Duino), Gradisca and Gorizia (with its county in Friuli).

=== Republic of Venice to 1918 ===
The region was relatively stable from the 16th century to the 1797 fall of the Republic of Venice, which was marked by the Treaty of Campo Formio between Austria and France. The Habsburgs gained Venetian lands on the Istrian Peninsula and the Quarnero (Kvarner) islands, expanded their holdings in 1813 with Napoleon's defeats and the dissolution of the French Illyrian provinces. Austria gained most of the republic's territories, including the Adriatic coast, Istria and portions of present-day Croatia (such as the city of Karlstadt).

Habsburg rule abolished political borders which had divided the area for almost 1,000 years. The territories were initially assigned to the new Kingdom of Illyria, which became the Austrian Littoral in 1849. This was established as a crown land (Kronland) of the Austrian Empire, consisting of three regions: the Istrian peninsula, Gorizia and Gradisca, and the city of Trieste.

The Italian-Austrian war of 1866, followed by the passage of what was then known as Veneto (the current Veneto and Friuli regions, except for the province of Gorizia) to Italy, did not directly affect the Littoral; however, a small community of Slavic speakers in northeastern Friuli (an area known as Slavia Friulana – Beneška Slovenija) became part of the Kingdom of Italy. Otherwise, the Littoral lasted until the end of the Austrian Empire in 1918.

The Italians in Julian March supported the Italian Risorgimento: as a consequence, the Austrians saw the Italians as enemies and favored the Slav communities of Julian March. During the meeting of the Council of Ministers of 12 November 1866, Emperor Franz Joseph I of Austria outlined a wide-ranging project aimed at the Germanization or Slavization of the areas of the empire with an Italian presence:

His Majesty expressed the precise order that action be taken decisively against the influence of the Italian elements still present in some regions of the Crown and, appropriately occupying the posts of public, judicial, masters employees as well as with the influence of the press, work in South Tyrol, Dalmatia and Littoral for the Germanization and Slavization of these territories according to the circumstances, with energy and without any regard. His Majesty calls the central offices to the strong duty to proceed in this way to what has been established.

— Franz Joseph I of Austria, Council of the Crown of 12 November 1866

Istrian Italians were more than 50% of the total population of Istria for centuries, while making up about a third of the population in 1900.

=== Kingdom of Italy (1918–1943) ===
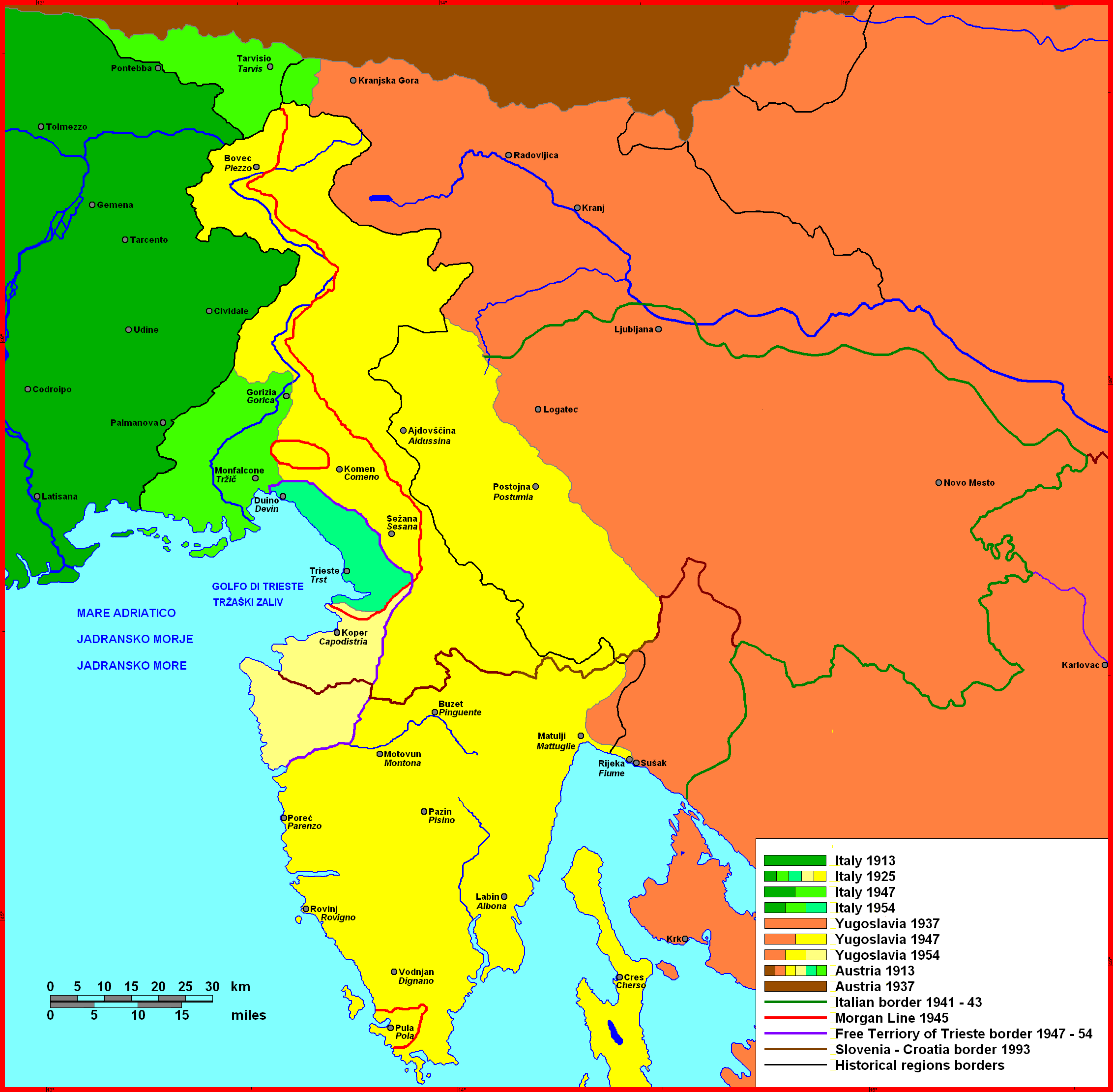
Changes to the Italian eastern border from 1920 to 1975. Areas annexed to Italy in 1920 by the Treaty of Rapallo (with adjustments of its border in 1924 after the Treaty of Rome); ceded to Yugoslavia in 1947 by the Treaty of Paris Areas annexed to Italy in 1920 which remained Italian after 1947 Areas annexed to Italy in 1920 which passed to the Free Territory of Trieste in 1947 with the Paris treaties; definitively assigned to Italy in 1975 by the Treaty of Osimo Areas annexed to Italy in 1920 which passed to the Free Territory of Trieste in 1947 with the Paris treaties; definitively assigned to Yugoslavia in 1975 by the Osimo treaty

The Kingdom of Italy annexed the region after World War I according to the Treaty of London and later Treaty of Rapallo, comprising most of the former Austrian Littoral (Gorizia and Gradisca, Trieste and Istria), south-western portions of the former Duchy of Carniola, and the current Italian municipalities of Tarvisio, Pontebba and Malborghetto Valbruna which had been Carinthian (aside from Fusine in Valromana in eastern Tarvisio, which had been part of Carniola). The annexed areas included many partially or fully Slovene or Croat areas. The island of Krk and the municipality of Kastav, which had formerly been part of the Austrian Littoral, became part of the Kingdom of Serbs, Croats and Slovenes (renamed the Kingdom of Yugoslavia in 1929).

Rijeka-Fiume, which had enjoyed special status within the Lands of the Crown of Saint Stephen (the Hungarian part of Austria-Hungary), became an independent city-state in the Treaty of Rapallo: the Free State of Fiume. It was abolished following the 1924 Treaty of Rome and divided between Italy and the Kingdom of Serbs, Croats and Slovenes.

The new provinces of Gorizia (which was merged with the Province of Udine between 1924 and 1927), Trieste, Pola and Fiume (after 1924) were created. Tarvisio, Pontebba, Malborghetto Valbruna, and the westernmost part of the former Littoral around Cervignano del Friuli remained part of Udine (and so Euganean Venetia) after 1927.

Italians lived primarily in cities and along the coast, and Slavs inhabited the interior. Fascist persecution, "centralising, oppressive and dedicated to the forcible Italianisation of the minorities", caused the emigration of about 105,000 Slovenes and Croats from the Julian March—around 70,000 to Yugoslavia and 30,000 to Argentina. Several thousand Dalmatian Italians moved from Yugoslavia to Italy after 1918, many to Istria and Trieste.

In response to the Fascist Italianization of Slovene areas, the militant anti-Fascist organization TIGR emerged in 1927. TIGR co-ordinated Slovene resistance against Fascist Italy until it was dismantled by the secret police in 1941, and some former members joined the Yugoslav Partisans. The Slovene Partisans emerged that year in the occupied Province of Ljubljana, and spread by 1942 to the other Slovene areas which had been annexed by Italy twenty years earlier.

=== German occupation and resistance (1943–1945) ===
After the Italian armistice of September 1943, many local uprisings took place. The town of Gorizia was temporarily liberated by partisans, and a liberated zone in the Upper Soča Valley known as the Kobarid Republic lasted from September to November 1943. The German Army began to occupy the region and encountered severe resistance from Yugoslav partisans, particularly in the lower Vipava Valley and the Alps. Most of the lowlands were occupied by the winter of 1943, but Yugoslav resistance remained active throughout the region and withdrew to the mountains.

In the aftermath of the fall 1943 Italian armistice, the first of what became known as the Foibe massacres occurred (primarily in present-day Croatian Istria). The Germans established the Operational Zone of the Adriatic Littoral, officially part of the Italian Social Republic but under de facto German administration, that year. Many areas, (especially north and north-east of Gorizia) were controlled by the partisan resistance, which was also active on the Karst Plateau and interior Istria. The Nazis tried to repress the Yugoslav guerrillas with reprisals against the civilian population; entire villages were burned down, and thousands of people were interned in Nazi concentration camps. However, the Yugoslav resistance took over most of the region by the spring of 1945.

Italian resistance in the operational zone was active in Friuli and weaker in the Julian March, where it was confined to intelligence and underground resistance in the larger towns (especially Trieste and Pula). In May 1945, the Yugoslav Army entered Trieste; over the following days, virtually the entire Julian March was occupied by Yugoslav forces. Retaliation against real (and potential) political opponents occurred, primarily to the Italian population.

=== Contested region (1945–1954) ===
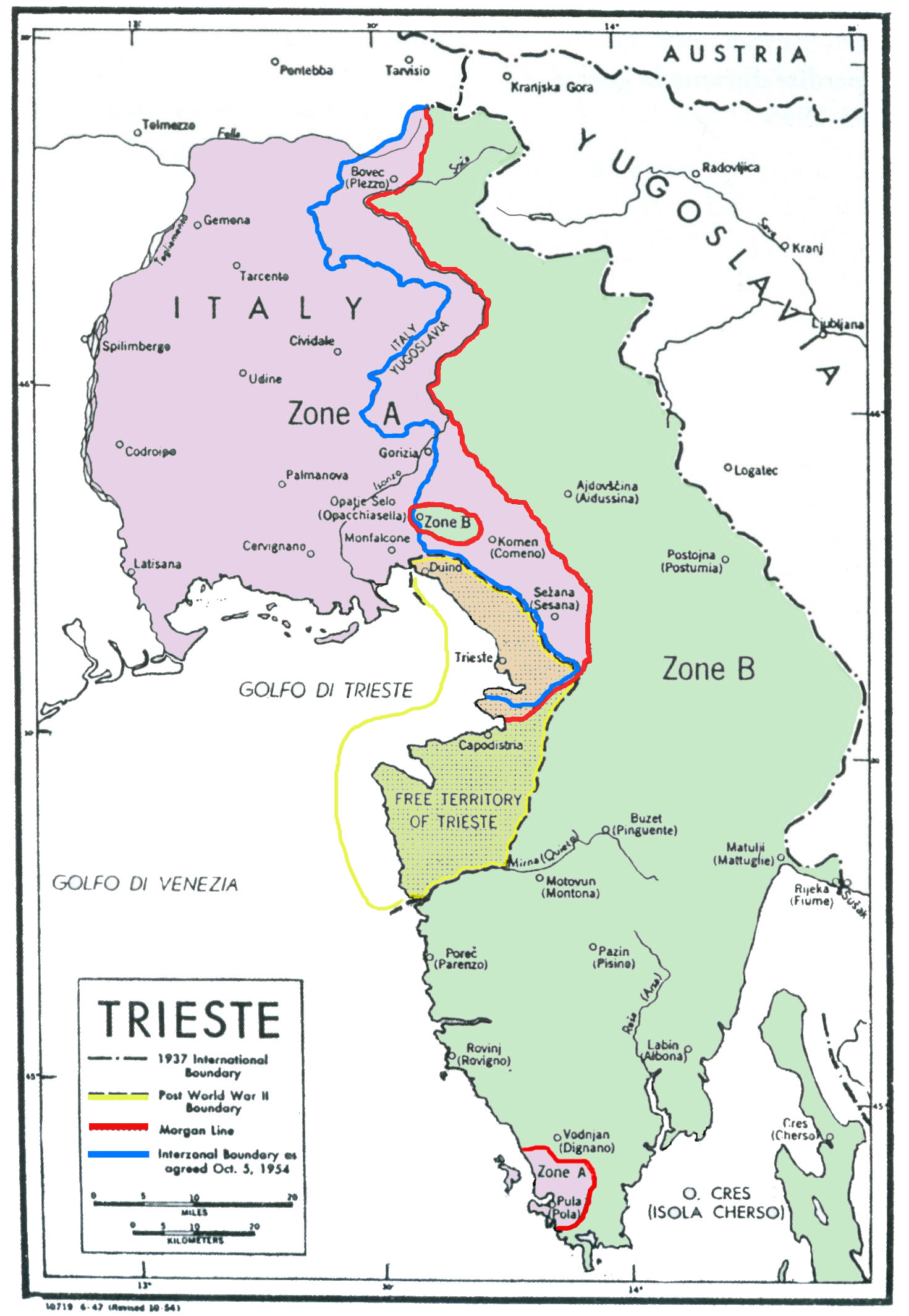
Division of the Julian March between June 1945 and September 1947, with the Morgan Line in red

The Western allies adopted the term "Julian March" as the name for the territories which were contested between Italy and the People's Federal Republic of Yugoslavia between 1945 and 1947. The Morgan Line was drawn in June 1945, dividing the region into two militarily administered zones. Zone B was under Yugoslav administration and excluded the cities of Pula, Gorizia, Trieste, the Soča Valley and most of the Karst Plateau, which were under joint British-American administration. During this period, many Italians left the Yugoslav-occupied area.

In 1946, U.S. President Harry S. Truman ordered an increase in U.S. troops in their occupation zone (Zone A) and the reinforcement of air forces in northern Italy after Yugoslav forces shot down two U.S. Army transport planes. An agreement on the border was chosen from four proposed solutions at the Paris Peace Conference that year. Yugoslavia acquired the northern part of the region east of Gorizia, most of Istria and the city of Fiume. A Free Territory of Trieste was created, divided into two zones—one under Allied and the other under Yugoslav military administration. Tensions continued, and in 1954 the territory was abolished and divided between Italy (which received the city of Trieste and its surroundings) and Yugoslavia, under the terms of the London Memorandum.

=== Since 1954 ===
In Slovenia the Julian March is known as the Slovene Littoral, encompassing the regions of Goriška and Slovenian Istria. In Croatia, the traditional name of Istria is used. After the divisions of 1947 and 1954, the term "Julian March" survived in the name of the Friuli-Venezia Giulia region of Italy.

The Treaty of Osimo was signed on 10 November 1975 by the Socialist Federal Republic of Yugoslavia and the Italian Republic in Osimo, Italy, to definitively divide the Free Territory of Trieste between the two states: the port city of Trieste with a narrow coastal strip to the north-west (Zone A) was given to Italy; a portion of the north-western part of the Istrian peninsula (Zone B) was given to Yugoslavia. The treaty became effective on 11 October 1977. For the Italian Government, the treaty was signed by Mariano Rumor, Minister for Foreign Affairs. For Yugoslavia, the treaty was signed by Miloš Minić, the Federal Secretary for Foreign Affairs.

== Ethnolinguistic structure ==
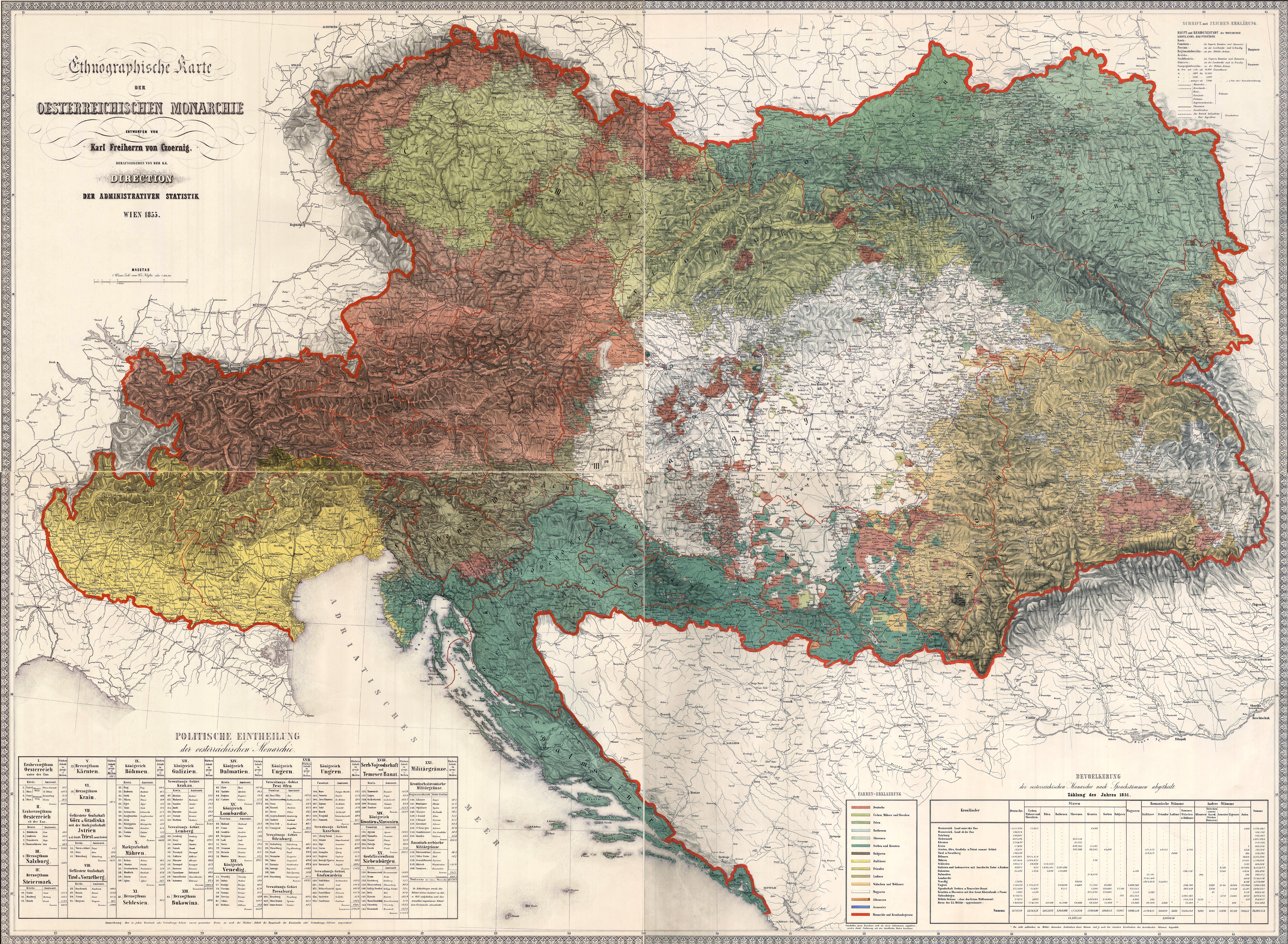
1855 ethnographic map of the Austrian Empire by Karl Freiherrn von Czoernig

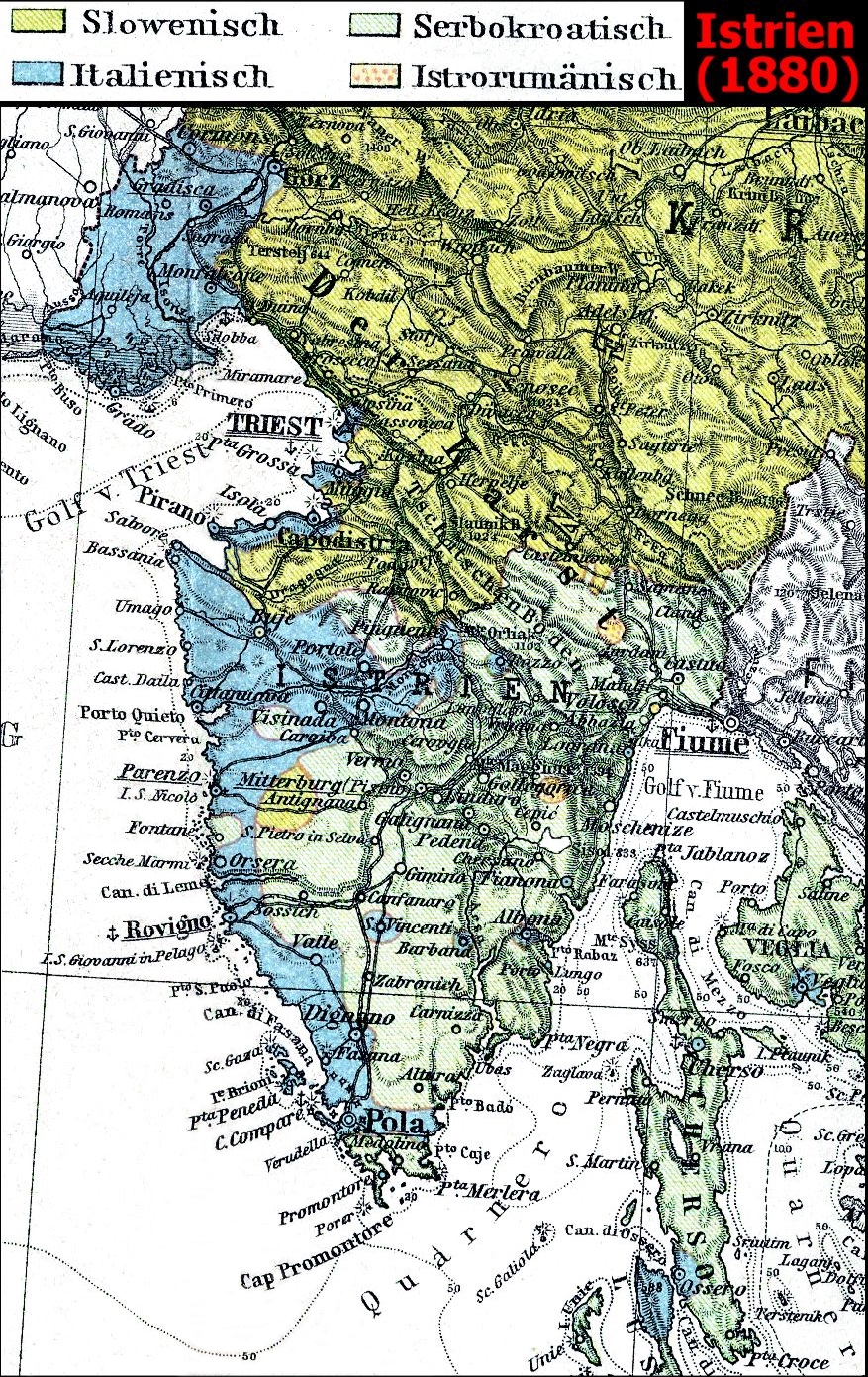
Ethnolinguistic map of Istria based on the 1880 census. Italian areas are shown in blue, Slovene areas in yellow and Croat areas in aquamarine.

Two major ethnolinguistic clusters were unified in the region. The western portion was inhabited primarily by Italians (Italian, Venetian and Friulian were the three major languages), with a small Istriot-speaking minority. The eastern and northern areas were inhabited by South Slavs (Slovenes and Croats), with small Montenegrin (Peroj) and Serb minorities.

Other ethnic groups included Istro-Romanians in eastern Istria, Carinthian Germans in the Canale Valley and smaller German- and Hungarian-speaking communities in larger urban centres, primarily members of the former Austro-Hungarian elite. This is illustrated by the 1855 ethnographic map of the Austrian Empire compiled by Karl von Czoernig-Czernhausen and issued by the Austrian k. u. k. department of statistics. According to the 1910–1911 Austrian census, the Austrian Littoral (which would be annexed by Italy from 1920 to 1924) had a population of 978,385. Italian was the everyday language (Umgangsprache) of 421,444 people (43.1 percent); 327,230 (33.4 percent) spoke Slovene, and 152,500 (15.6 percent) spoke Croatian. About 30,000 people (3.1 percent) spoke German, 3,000 (0.3 percent) spoke Hungarian, and small clusters of Istro-Romanian and Czech speakers existed. The Friulian, Venetian and Istriot languages were considered Italian; an estimated 60,000 or more "Italian" speakers (about 14 percent) spoke Friulian.

=== Romance languages ===
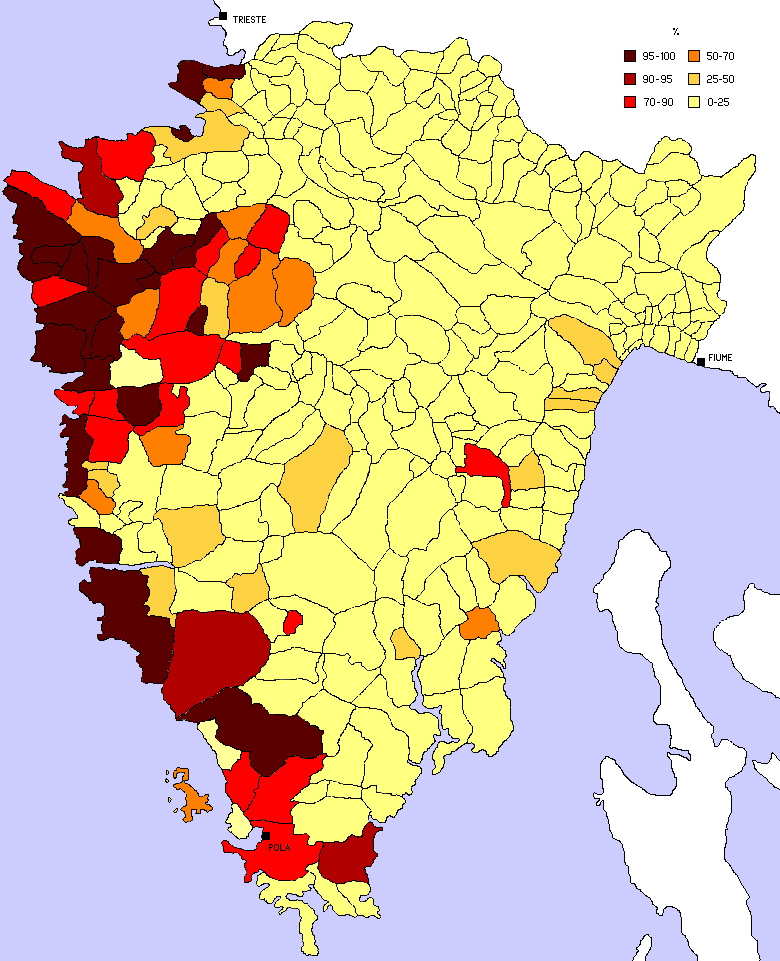
Percentage of native Italian (including Venetian and Istriot) speakers in Istria, according to the 1910 Austrian census

The standard Italian language was common among educated people in Trieste, Gorizia, Istria and Fiume/Rijeka. In Trieste (and to a lesser extent in Istria), Italian was the predominant language in primary education. The Italian-speaking elite dominated the governments of Trieste and Istria under Austro-Hungarian rule, although they were increasingly challenged by Slovene and Croatian political movements. Before 1918, Trieste was the only self-governing Austro-Hungarian unit in which Italian speakers were the majority of the population.

Most of the Romance-speaking population did not speak standard Italian as their native language, but two other closely related Romance languages: Friulian and Venetian. There was no attempt to introduce Venetian into education and administration.

Friulian was spoken in the south-western lowlands of the county of Gorizia and Gradisca (except for the Monfalcone-Grado area, where Venetian was spoken), and in the town of Gorizia. Larger Friulian-speaking centres included Cormons, Cervignano, and Gradisca d'Isonzo. A dialect of Friulian (Tergestine) was spoken in Trieste and Muggia, evolving into a Venetian dialect during the 18th century. According to contemporary estimates, three-quarters of the Italians in the county of Gorizia and Gradisca were native Friulian speakers—one-quarter of the county's population, and seven to eight percent of the population of the Julian March.

Venetian dialects were concentrated in Trieste, Rijeka and Istria, and the Istro-Venetian dialect was the predominant language of the west Istrian coast. In many small west Istrian towns, such as Koper (Capodistria), Piran (Pirano) or Poreč (Parenzo), the Venetian-speaking majority reached 90 percent of the population and 100 percent in Umag (Umago) and Muggia. Venetian was also a strong presence on Istria's Cres-Lošinj archipelago and in the peninsula's eastern and interior towns such as Motovun, Labin, Plomin and, to a lesser extent, Buzet and Pazin. Although Istro-Venetian was strongest in urban areas, clusters of Venetian-speaking peasants also existed. This was especially true for the area around Buje and Grožnjan in north-central Istria, where Venetian spread during the mid-19th century (often in the form of a Venetian-Croat pidgin). In the county of Gorizia and Gradisca, Venetian was spoken in the area around Monfalcone and Ronchi (between the lower Isonzo River and the Karst Plateau) in an area popularly known as Bisiacaria and in the town of Grado. In Trieste the local Venetian dialect (known as Triestine) was widely spoken, although it was the native language of only about half the city's population. In Rijeka-Fiume, a form of Venetian known as Fiumano emerged during the late 18th and early 19th centuries and became the native language of about half the city's population.

In addition to these two large language groups, two smaller Romance communities existed in Istria. In the south-west, on the coastal strip between Pula and Rovinj, the archaic Istriot language was spoken. In some villages of eastern Istria, north of Labin, the Istro-Romanian language was spoken by about 3,000 people.

=== South Slavic languages ===
Slovene was spoken in the north-eastern and southern parts of Gorizia and Gradisca (by about 60 percent of the population), in northern Istria and in the Inner Carniolan areas annexed by Italy in 1920 (Postojna, Vipava, Ilirska Bistrica and Idrija). It was also the primary language of one-fourth to one-third of the population of Trieste. Smaller Slovene-speaking communities lived in the Canale Valley (Carinthian Slovenes), in Rijeka and in larger towns outside the Slovene Lands (especially Pula, Monfalcone, Gradisca d'Isonzo and Cormons). Slavia Friulana – Beneška Slovenija, the community living since the eighth century in small towns (such as Resia) in the valleys of the Natisone, Torre and Judrio Rivers in Friuli, has been part of Italy since 1866.

A variety of Slovene dialects were spoken throughout the region. The Slovene linguistic community in the Julian March was divided into as many as 11 dialects (seven larger and four smaller dialects), belonging to three of the seven dialect groups into which Slovene is divided. Most Slovenes were fluent in standard Slovene, with the exception of some northern Istrian villages (where primary education was in Italian and the Slovene national movement penetrated only in the late 19th century) and the Carinthian Slovenes in the Canale Valley, who were Germanised until 1918 and frequently spoke only the local dialect.

Slovene-Italian bilingualism was present only in some north-west Istrian coastal villages and the confined semi-urban areas around Gorizia and Trieste, while the vast majority of Slovene speakers had little (or no) knowledge of Italian; German was the predominant second language of the Slovene rural population.

Croatian was spoken in the central and eastern Istrian peninsula, on the Cres-Lošinj archipelago; it was the second-most-spoken language (after Venetian) in the town of Rijeka. The Kajkavian dialect of Serbo-Croatian was spoken around Buzet in north-central Istria; Čakavian was predominant in all other areas, frequently with strong Kajkavian and Venetian vocabulary influences. Italian-Croatian bilingualism was frequent in western Istria, on the Cres-Lošinj archipelago and in Rijeka, but rare elsewhere.

=== Linguistic minorities ===
German was the predominant language in secondary and higher education throughout the region until 1918, and the educated elite were fluent in German. Many Austrian civil servants used German in daily life, especially in larger urban centres. Most of the German speakers would speak Italian, Slovene or Croatian on social and public occasions, depending on their political and ethnic preferences and location. Among the rural population, German was spoken by about 6,000 people in the Canale Valley. In the major urban areas (primarily Trieste and Rijeka), Hungarian, Serbian, Czech and Greek were spoken by smaller communities.

== Flags ==
Official flag of the Austrian Litoral (1849–1919)

Official flag of the Austrian Litoral (1849–1919) (with coat of arms)

== See also ==
- Austrian Riviera
- Battles of the Isonzo
- Dalmatia
- London Pact
- History of Trieste
- Venetian Slovenia
- Operation Unthinkable
