= Austrian Riviera =

Advertising term for Austrian Gorizia and Istria

The Austrian Riviera (German: Österreichische Riviera, Italian: Riviera Austriaca, Slovene: Avstrijska riviera, Croatian: Austrijska rivijera) was a term used for advertising the seaside resorts on the Adriatic coast of the Austrian crown lands of Gorizia and Istria. The name arose with the emergence of tourism in the Austrian Littoral from the mid 19th century onwards and was common until the dissolution of the Austro-Hungarian Empire at the end of World War I.

The Riviera covered the coastal areas centered around the Imperial Free City of Trieste and its port, it stretched from Grado via Duino, Brijuni to Opatija and the border with the Habsburg Kingdom of Croatia. The southeastern continuation is called the Croatian Littoral. Today split between Italy, Slovenia and Croatia, the coast still presents a picturesque landscape, numerous historic buildings, and a year-round mild Mediterranean climate.

== Geography ==
The Austrian coast ran from the border with the Kingdom of Italy (Veneto) on the Gulf of Trieste down to Pula on the southern tip of the Istrian peninsula and to Opatija on the Kvarner Gulf. The Istrian coast up to Trieste is now part of the Italian municipality of Muggia (Slovene: Milje), the Coastal-Karst of Slovenia, and the County of Istria in Croatia. The coast north of Trieste is partially rocky, and partially sandy, with the Laguna di Grado; it is now part of the autonomous Friuli-Venezia Giulia region of Italy.

== History ==
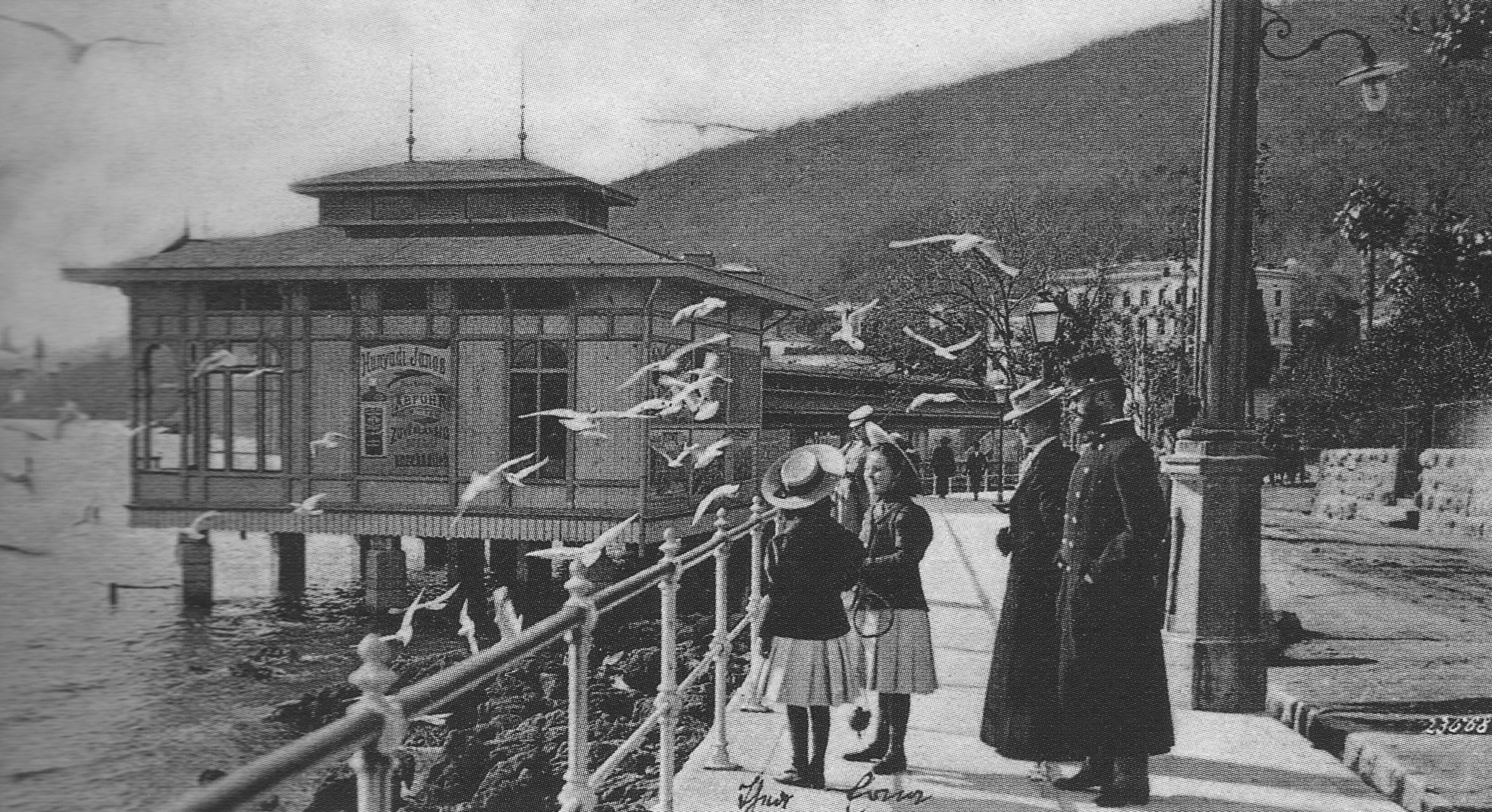
Promenade in Opatija circa 1900

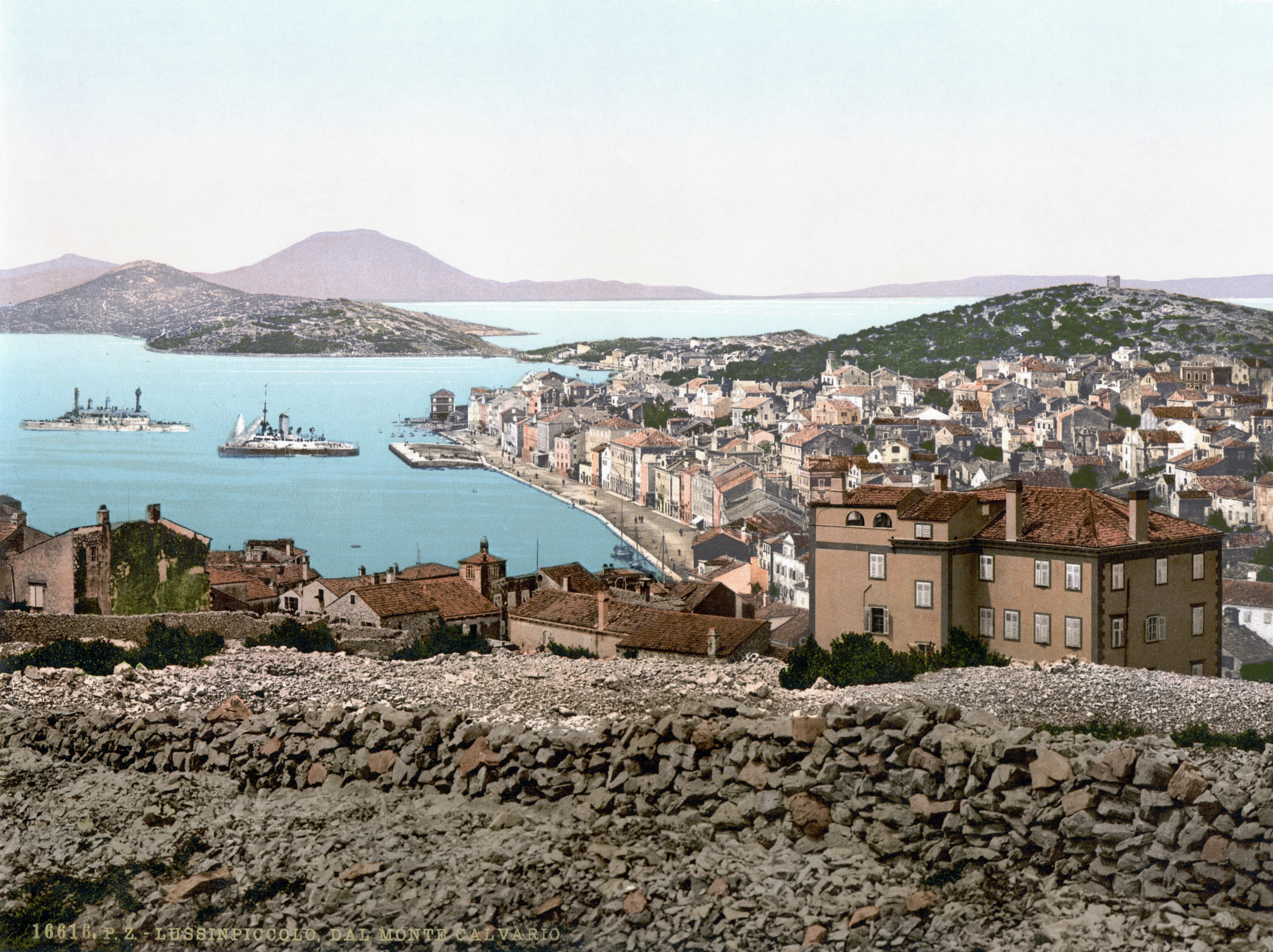
Mali Lošinj circa 1900

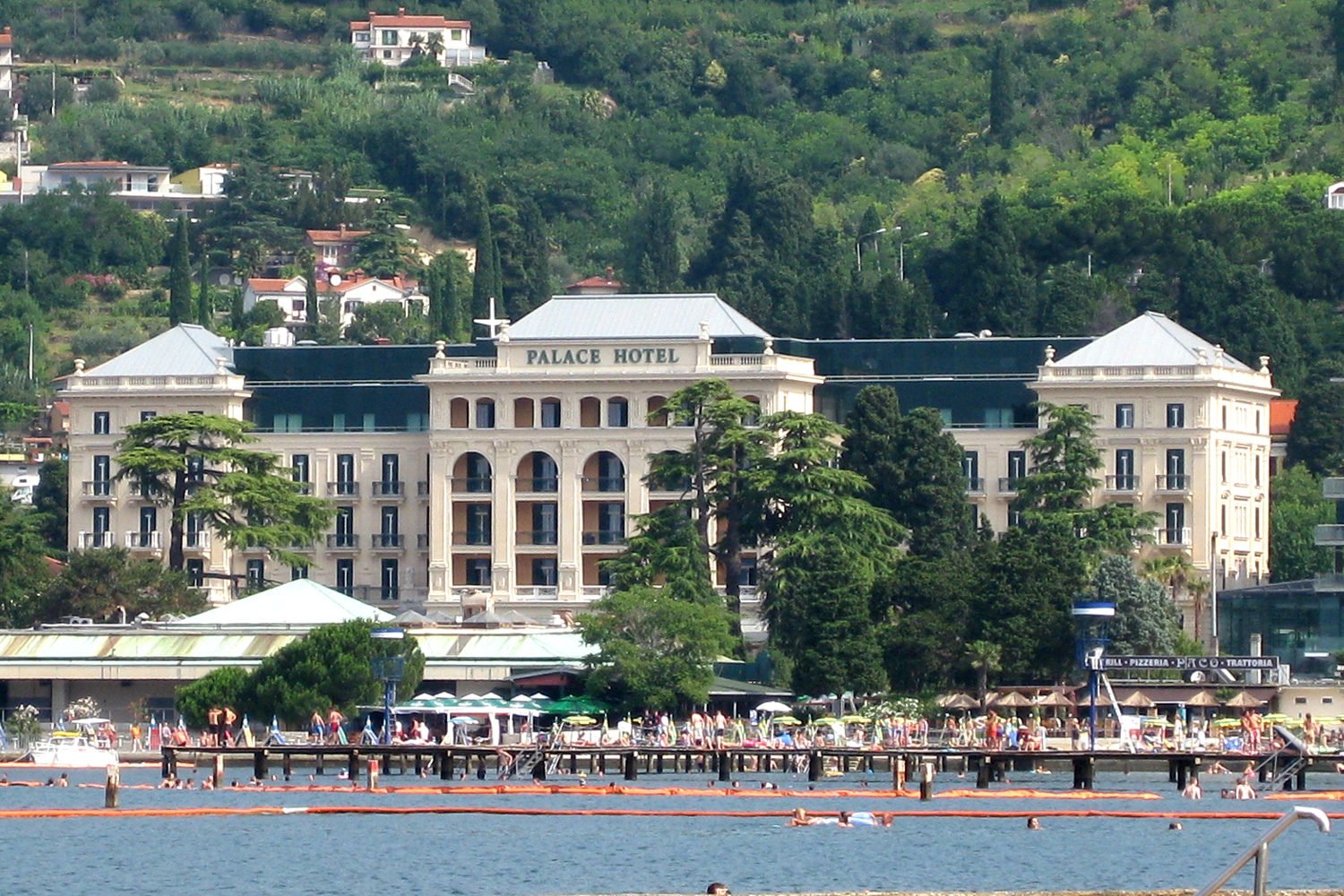
Today's Kempinski Palace Hotel in Portorož, opened in 1910

In Ancient Roman times, the region was the site of important settlements like Aquileia. From the Late Middle Ages until the 1797 Treaty of Campo Formio, most of the area was administered by the Republic of Venice, while in 1382, Trieste was joined with the Habsburg monarchy which also controlled most of the hinterland. Trieste developed into an important port and trade hub and by 1719, a free port was constituted and further developed as the Habsburg Austria's principal commercial port and shipbuilding center. The Habsburgs had also acquired the adjacent lands of Gorizia and held some smaller eastern Istrian territories which were administered within Inner Austria.

In 1815, after the Napoleonic Wars, the remaining coastal villages became part of the new Austrian Empire and the completion of the Southern Railway line from Vienna to Trieste in 1857 not only helped to further develop trade between the two cities but also brought Viennese upper class society to the mild winters of the Littoral. Trieste developed into a buzzing cosmopolitan city visited by artists, musicians, poets and writers from all over the Austrian Empire (Austria-Hungary from 1867) and the rest of Europe. The surrounding coastal towns and villages developed into favorite hot spots for the rich and famous.

In 1850, Lošinj (Italian: Lussino, German: Lötzing) became a summer residence of the Habsburg Imperial family, and in 1860 Miramare Castle was completed for Archduke Maximilian.

In 1883, the beach resort on Brijuni Islands (Italian Brioni) was set up, and in 1904 the Austrian Riviera Journal (Österreichische Riviera Zeitung) was first published in Pula (Italian, German Pola).

Resorts:

- Grado (Slovene Gradež)
- Duino (Devin)
- Sistiana (Sesljan)
- Muggia (Milje)
- Portorož (Italian Portorose)
- Poreč (Parenzo)
- Rovinj (Rovigno)
- Opatija (Abbazia)
- Lovran (Laurana)
- Mali Lošinj (Lussinpiccolo)

Several luxury hotels were built during this era, like the Hotel Kvarner in Opatija (1884) and Hotel Palace in Portorož (1910).

The eastern shore of Kvarner Gulf was then under administration of the Hungarian part of Austria-Hungary with additional resorts developing, like Kraljevica (Italian: Porto Re), Crikvenica and Novi Vinodolski.

== After World War I ==
In 1919, after World War I, the Austrian Riviera became part of Italy and was cut off from most of its hinterland. During the 1920s, the Riviera flourished somewhat as an "Austro-Italian Riviera", but the splendor of its heyday was gone. The French Riviera and Italian Riviera in the western Mediterranean became more favorable resorts.

In 1947 Trieste, together with a small stretch of the adjacent coast became an independent Free Territory of Trieste. However, in 1954, the Free Territory was dissolved and its territory split between Italy and Yugoslavia. Trieste, Grado, Sistiana and Muggia remained part of Italy.

== Other ==
After the political closure of most of the Adriatic Coast in 1945 due to the Cold War, the State of Carinthia in Austria began to call its Wörthersee lake district the "Austrian Riviera."

== See also ==
- Austrian Littoral
- Croatian Littoral
- Istria
- Riviera, featuring links to articles on the many coastal strips around the world which are known as Riviera
- Slovenian Littoral
- Venezia Giulia
