= Austrian Littoral =

Former crown land of the Austrian Empire

Coordinates: 45.6333°N 13.8000°E

Austrian Littoral Österreichisches Küstenland (German) Litorale austriaco (Italian) Austrijsko primorje (Croatian) Avstrijsko primorje (Slovene) Osztrák Tengermellék (Hungarian)
- 1849–1919
- Flag Coat of arms
- Anthem: Carevka (Gott erhalte, Gott beschütze)
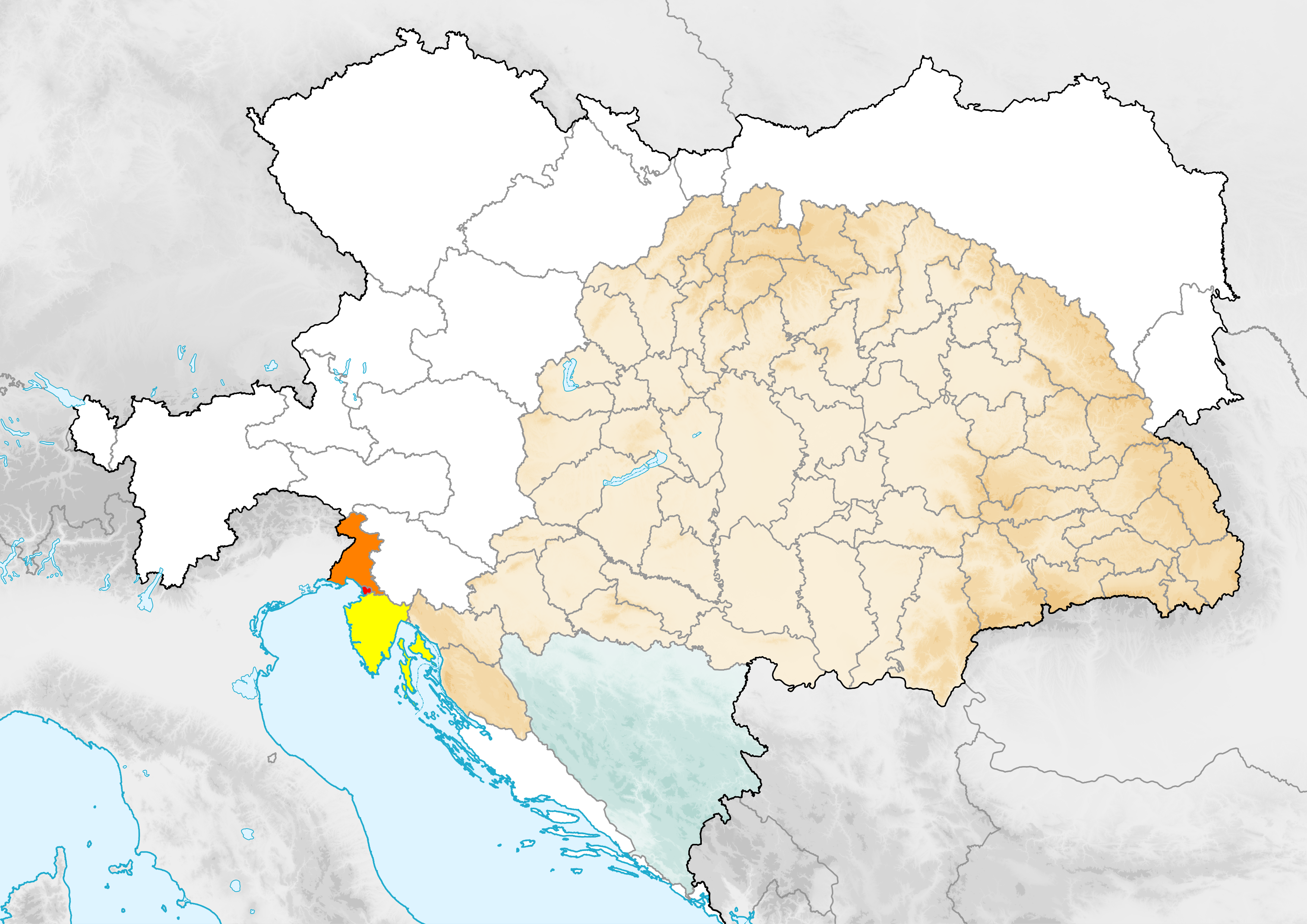
- Austrian Littoral within Cisleithanian Austria-Hungary, 1914 Princely County of Gorizia and Gradisca Imperial Free City of Trieste Margraviate of Istria
- Status: Subdivision of Austria-Hungary: Imperial Free City of Trieste; Margravate of Istria; Princely County of Gorizia and Gradisca
- Capital: Trieste (not part until 1860)
- Common languages: Italian; Slovene; Croatian; German
- Religion: Roman Catholic
- Government: Stadtholder
- Emperor of Austria
  - 1848–1916: Franz Joseph I
  - 1916–1918: Karl I
- Statthalter of Trieste
  - 1849–1850: Johann von Grimschitz
  - 1850–1854: Franz Graf Wimpffen
  - 1867–1868: Eduard von Bach
  - 1915–1918: Alfred von Fries-Skene
  - Upper house: Landtag
- Historical era: Modern history
  - Spring of Nations: 4 March 1849
  - Treaty of Saint-Germain: 10 September 1919

Population
  - 1910: 894,287
| Preceded by | Succeeded by |
| Kingdom of Illyria | Julian March |

The Austrian Littoral (German: Österreichisches Küstenland, Italian: Litorale austriaco, Croatian: Austrijsko primorje, Slovene: Avstrijsko primorje, Hungarian: Osztrák Tengermellék) was a crown land (Kronland) of the Austrian Empire, established in 1849. It consisted of three regions: the Margraviate of Istria in the south, Gorizia and Gradisca in the north, and the Imperial Free City of Trieste in the middle. The region has been contested frequently, with parts of it controlled at various times by the Republic of Venice, Austria-Hungary, Italy, and Yugoslavia among others.

The Kingdom of Italy annexed most of the area after World War I according to the Treaty of London and later the Treaty of Rapallo. After World War II it was split, with Italy in the west and Yugoslavia in the east.

Trieste had strategic importance as Austria-Hungary's primary seaport, and the coast of the Littoral was a resort destination known as the Austrian Riviera. The region was a multi-ethnic one, with Italians, Slovenes, Croats, Germans and Friulians being the main groups. In 1910, it had an area of 7,969 square kilometres (3,077 sq mi) and a population of 894,287.

== History ==
The territory of the medieval Patriarchate of Aquileia had gradually been conquered by the Republic of Venice (Domini di Terraferma) until the early 15th century. In the east, the Habsburg archdukes of Austria, based on the March of Carniola they held from 1335, had gained suzerainty over Istrian Pazin in 1374 and the port of Trieste in 1382. They also purchased Duino and Rijeka (Fiume) on the northern Adriatic coast in 1474, and inherited more territory in Friuli when the Counts of Görz line died out in 1500. In 1511, Emperor Maximilian I annexed the city of Gradisca from Venice.

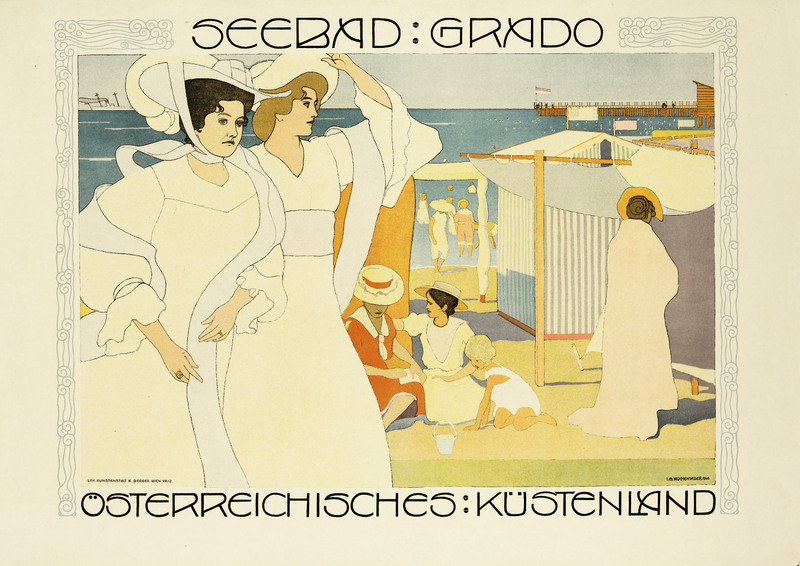
A 1906 postcard of the Seebad Grado on the Austrian Littoral

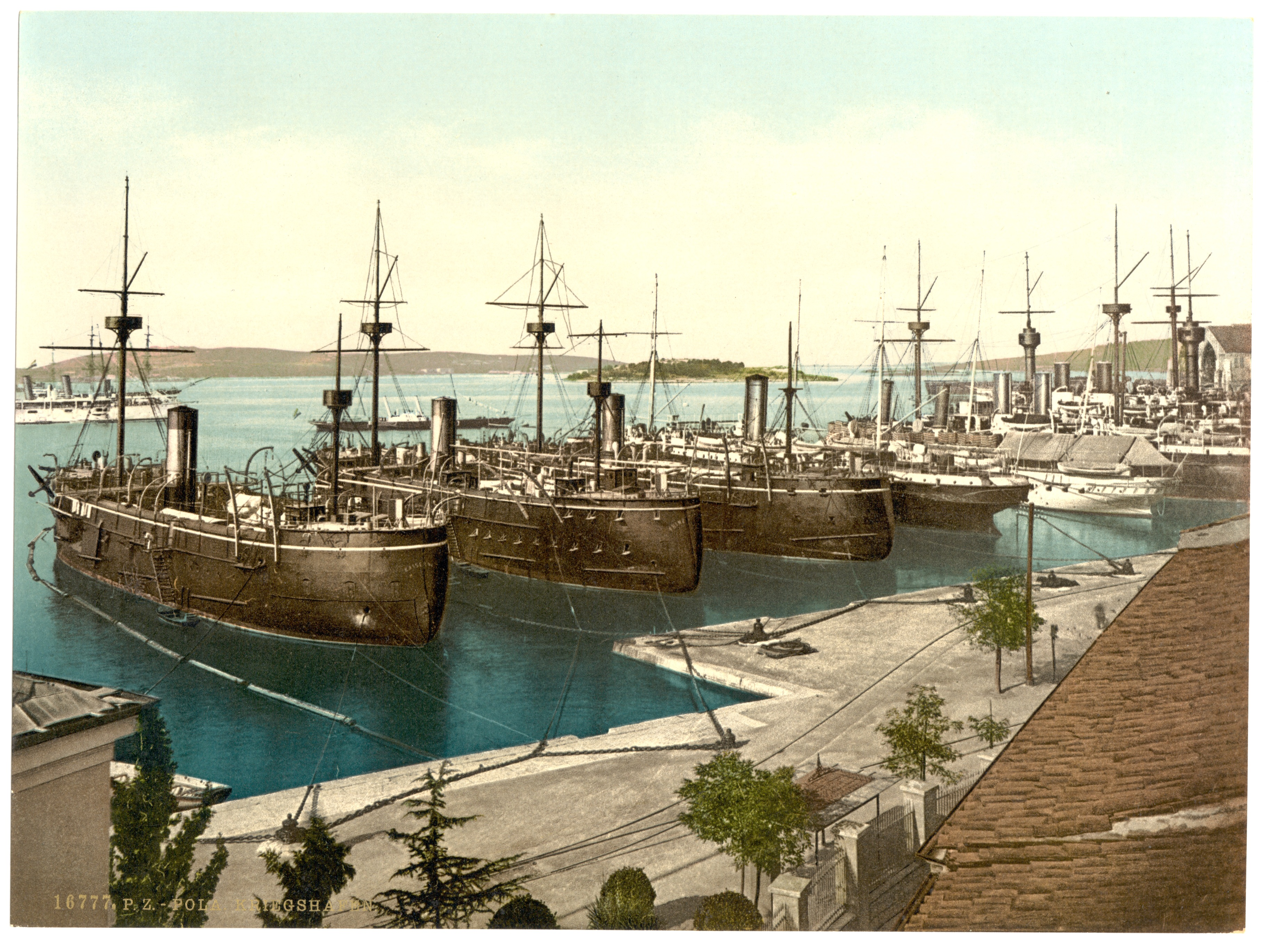
The Navy Yard at Pula on Istria

The Habsburgs did little initially to consolidate or develop their holdings in the Littoral. The supremacy of the Republic of Venice in the Adriatic, and the Austrian archdukes' attention to the threat posed to them by an expanding Ottoman Empire, gave them little opportunity to enlarge their coastal possessions. Incorporated into the Austrian Circle of the Holy Roman Empire, Görz, Trieste and Istria remained separately administered and retained their autonomy until the 18th century.

Emperor Charles VI increased the sea power of the Habsburg monarchy by making peace with the Ottomans and declaring free shipping in the Adriatic. In 1719, Trieste and Fiume were made free ports. In 1730, administration of the Littoral was unified under the Intendancy in Trieste. However, in 1775, Emperor Joseph II put the two main ports under separate administration, assigning Trieste as the port for the Austrian "hereditary lands" and Fiume for the Kingdom of Hungary. Shortly after that, Trieste was merged with the Princely County of Gorizia and Gradisca in the north.

During the Napoleonic Wars, the Habsburg monarchy gained Venetian lands in the Istrian Peninsula and the Quarnero (Kvarner) Islands as part of the Treaty of Campo Formio of 1797. However, these territories and all of the new Austrian Empire's Adriatic lands were soon lost to the French Empire's puppet state the Kingdom of Italy, by the Treaty of Pressburg of 1805. The 1809 Treaty of Schönbrunn then transferred the area to the Illyrian Provinces, which were directly ruled by France.

When Napoleon was later defeated, the Austrian Empire regained the region. In 1813, all of the Littoral including Trieste, Gorizia and Gradisca, all of Istria, the Quarnero Islands, Fiume, and the hinterland of Fiume, Civil Croatia, including Karlstadt (Karlovac), became one administrative unit. From 1816, the Littoral was a part of the Austrian Empire's Kingdom of Illyria. In 1822, Fiume and Civil Croatia were separated from the territory and ceded to the Kingdom of Hungary (and in 1849 went to Croatia).

The Littoral was officially the Triest (Trieste) Province, one of two gouvernements (provinces) of the kingdom, the other being Laibach (Ljubljana). It was subdivided into four kreise (districts): Görz (Gorizia), including Gorizia and the Julian March; Istrien (Istria), which was eastern Istria and the Quarnero Islands; Triest (Trieste), which was the Trieste hinterland and Western Istria; and the Triester Stadtgebiet (city of Trieste).

Around 1825, the Littoral was reorganized into only two subdivisions: Istria, with its capital at Mitterburg (Pisino/Pazin), and Gorizia. Trieste and its immediate surroundings were put under the direct control of the crown, separate from the local administrative structure.

In 1849, the Kingdom of Illyria was dissolved and the Littoral became a separate crown land with a governor in Trieste. It was formally divided into the Margravate of Istria and the Princely County (Gefürstete Grafschaft) of Gorizia and Gradisca with Trieste remaining separate from both.

By the 1861 February Patent, Gorizia and Gradisca and Istria became administratively separate entities and, in 1867, Trieste received separate status as well, and the Littoral was divided into the three crown lands of the Imperial Free City of Trieste and its suburbs, the Margraviate of Istria, and the Princely County of Gorizia and Gradisca, which each had separate administrations and Landtag assemblies, but were all subject to a k.k. statholder at Trieste.

Following the dissolution of Austria-Hungary, the Littoral fell within Italy's newly expanded borders as part of the Julian March. An area of similar extent under the name of Adriatic Littoral (Adriatisches Küstenland) was one of the operational zones of German forces during World War II after the capitulation of Italy in September 1943 until the end of the war. After World War II, most of it was included in the Second Yugoslavia.

Today Croatia and Slovenia each hold portions of the territory, and the city of Trieste remains under Italian rule. The name of the region lives on in its Slovene version, Primorska (Slovenian Littoral), a region of Slovenia.

== Area and population ==
The crownland Küstenland (Littoral) bordered in green in 1856

Area:

- Gorizia and Gradisca: 2,918 km^{2} - 89.3 persons/km^{2}
- Istria: 4,956 km^{2} - 81.4 persons/km^{2}
- Triest: 95 km^{2} - 2414.8 persons/km^{2}

The population of the Crown land 'Istrien, Görz, Gradiska u. Triest' later to be known collectively as the Austrian Littoral was in 1855 in total 542.916 and composed of the following groups: 202.286 Slovenians, 137.473 Italians, 88.343 Croatians, 49.552 Friulians, 44.160 Serbs, 13.551 Germans, 4.756 Jews and 2.795 Romanians/Vlachs. In 1900 the Austrian Littoral had a population of 756.546, and in 1910 a population of 893.797. According to the last Austrian census of 1910 (1911 in Trieste), the Austrian Littoral was composed of the following linguistic communities:

Gorizia and Gradisca: 260,590 Population (1910 Census) (Note: Österreichische Nationalbibliothek 1. Band Volkszählung 1910 link text Heft 1 p39 p59 Heft 2 p38)

- Citizens 95,85 % non-Citizens 4,15 %
- Slovene: 59,27 % (154,564 Citizens present)
- Italian: 34,59 % (90,119 Citizens present)
- German: 1,72 % (4,486 Citizens present)

Trieste: 224,966 Population (1910 Census) (Note: Österreichische Nationalbibliothek 1. Band Volkszählung 1910 link text Heft 1 p39 p59 Heft 2 p38)

- Citizens 83,20 % non-Citizens 16,80 %
- Italian: 51,86 % (118,959 Citizens present)
- Slovene: 24,80 % (56,916 Citizens present)
- German: 5,16 % (11,856 Citizens present)
- Serbo-Croatian: 1,04 % (2,403 Citizens present)

Istria: 404,622 Population (1910 Census) (Note: Österreichische Nationalbibliothek 1. Band Volkszählung 1910 link text Heft 1 p39 p59 Heft 2 p38)

- Citizens 95,74 % non-Citizens 4,26 %
- Serbo-Croatian: 41,55 % (168,184 Citizens present)
- Italian: 36,46 % (147,417 Citizens present)
- Slovene: 13,71 % (55,134 Citizens present)
- German: 3,28 % (12,735 Citizens present)

The Austrian censuses did not count ethnic groups, nor the mother tongue, but the "language of daily interaction" (Umgangssprache). Except for a small Serbian community in Trieste and the village of Peroj in Istria.

After 1880, Italian and Friulian languages were counted under one category, as Italian. The estimated number of Friulian speakers can be extrapolated from the Italian census of 1921, the only one in the 20th century when Friulian was counted as a distinct linguistic category. The Austrian Littoral had a large number of foreign nationals (around 71,000 or 7.9% of the overall population), which were not asked about their language of interaction. More than half of them resided in the city of Trieste. The majority were citizens of the Kingdom of Italy, followed by citizens of the Kingdom of Hungary (part of the Dual Monarchy) and the German Empire. It can be supposed that the majority of these foreign citizens were Italian speakers, followed by German, Croatian (from Rijeka and Croatia-Slavonia) and Slovene (from Venetian Slovenia), and Hungarian speakers.

== Districts ==
=== Gorizia and Gradisca ===
- Gorizia City (Stadt Görz)
- Gorizia (Görz Land)
- Gradisca
- Monfalcone (Falkenberg)
- Sežana (Sesana)
- Tolmin (Tolmein, Tolmino)

=== Istria ===
- Koper (Capodistria)
- Krk (Veglia)
- Lošinj (Lussin)
- Poreč (Parenzo)
- Pazin (Mitterburg, Pisino)
- Pula (Pola)
- Volosko (Volosca)

== See also ==
- Austrian Riviera
- Battles of the Isonzo
- Croatian Littoral
- History of Trieste
- London Pact
