= Hotel Palace Portorož =

Hotel in Portorož, Slovenia

Coordinates: 45°30′52.89″N 13°35′31.04″E

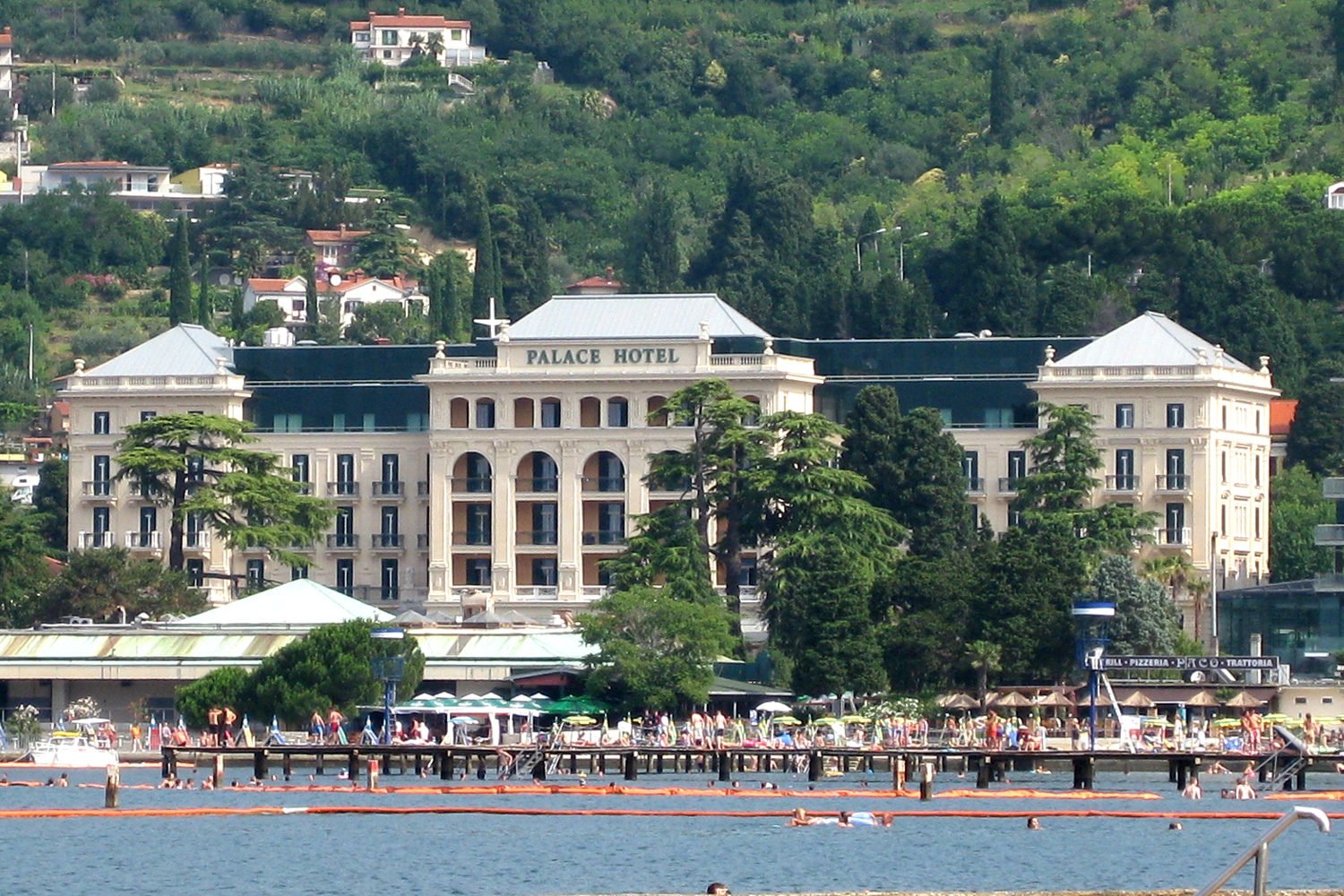
- Interactive map of the Hotel Palace Portorož area

General information
- Location: Portorož, southwestern Slovenia, Obala 45, Portorož
- Opening: 20 August 1910, reopened on 18 October 2008
- Closed: autumn 1990
- Owner: MK Group
- Operator: Minor Hotels

Other information
- Number of rooms: 181
- Number of suites: 1 presidential, Laguna, Venice, Piran, Palace, Rose
- Number of restaurants: 2
- Parking: Garage Parking

The Hotel Palace Portorož (Slovene: "Hotel Palace") is a five-star deluxe hotel in Portorož, a settlement on the Adriatic coast in southwestern Slovenia. It is the only deluxe hotel in Slovenia.

== History ==
Construction of the Palace Hotel began in 1908. It was designed by Austrian architect Johann Eustacchio and opened on 20 August 1910. At the time, the city was known as Portorose. Along with Grado and Abbazia, it was one of the most important coastal resorts on the Austrian Riviera in the Austro-Hungarian Empire.

The hotel was damaged during World War II. Renovations began in 1949, and it reopened in 1951. From 1964 to 1972, it was the home of the Portorož Casino.

At the end of 1983, the hotel was proclaimed a cultural monument, and a park in front of hotel was called a monument of designed nature. The hotel closed in autumn 1990.

In the 2000s, the Slovenian owner, coastal company Istrabenz Hoteli Portorož, signed a contract with German hotel chain Kempinski to run and manage the hotel. When they renovated the hotel, the exterior was kept for historical reasons and almost everything else was demolished; however most of the interior was rebuilt in the classical style. The renovation was planned by Slovenian architects API ARHITEKTI and cost about 70 million euros. In addition, a modern hotel building was built next to the original hotel. The hotel reopened on 18 October 2008 as Kempinski Palace Portorož.

On 12 February 2026, Minor Hotels assumed management of the hotel, which left the Kempinski chain and joined Minor's Anantara Hotels & Resorts division.
