= Eleonora Jenko Groyer =

Slovene physician (1879–1959)

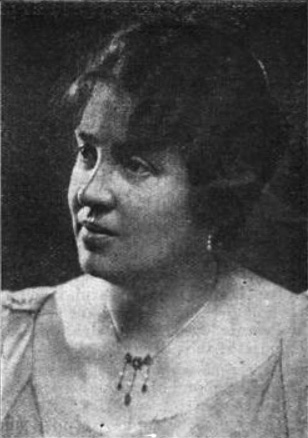
- Groyer in 1930
- Born: Eleonora Jenko; 15 February 1879; Ljubljana, Austria-Hungary
- Died: 24 June 1959 (aged 80); Ljubljana, Austria-Hungary
- Occupation: physician
- Known for: the first female Slovene physician

Eleonora Jenko Groyer (15 February 1879 – 24 June 1959) was a Slovenian physician, notable for becoming the first female physician from Slovene Lands.

== Early life and education ==
Eleonora Jenko was born on 15 February 1879 in Ljubljana, then part of Austria-Hungary, to a highly educated family. Her father was the physician Ludvik Jenko and her mother Terezija Jenko (née Lenče) who was also an educated woman, having studied with Ursulines in Ljubljana and in Bavaria, as well as spending a year in Moscow. She assisted her husband in his practice, and the couple actively participated in Slovene cultural life as advocates of Pan-Slavism. They had four children of whom Eleonora was the eldest. All siblings obtained higher education, most notably Eleonora's sister Ana who went on to become the first Slovene woman with a doctorate in science.

Eleonora Jenko finished her primary education with Ursulines in Ljubljana. Her parents planned for her to obtain higher education, but existing local schools for girls didn't enable enrollment in universities, so she was sent to the Maria Alexandrovna Institute for Girls in Cetinje. This decision was motivated by her parents' pro-Russian stance and the information that a medical college for women was opening soon in Saint Petersburg. After graduation, Eleonora Jenko therefore moved to Russia, but was unable to start her medical studies since her curriculum thus far lacked Latin. Instead, she enrolled in the Philosophical faculty in 1897 and switched the next year after passing an exam in Latin. Her 10-semester study was interrupted by a typhus infection and later for two years by the Russo-Japanese War, during which time she worked at a military hospital for women and children in Moscow.

She finished her study on 14 February 1907 after completing oral and practical exams to become the first Slovene woman with a medical degree. In December that year, she married an Austrian physician and naval officer, Friederik Groyer, who had a medical practice in a Klimkovice spa, and started as his assistant. In May 1908, their daughter Jolanda was born.

== Career ==
Later records show that Jenko Groyer worked as an unpaid physician at a state hospital in Ljubljana, with special permission of the executive government, while her husband moved to Matulji. She assisted in gynaecological operations and also performed some operations herself there. In 1911, the Ministry of the Interior formally recognized her degree and issued her permission to establish medical practice, despite formal opposition from the parliamentary chamber of representatives, but without nostrification, meaning that she was not allowed to sign herself as "dr.". She then followed her husband to the Austrian Littoral to start a private practice in Opatija. Her patients there were exclusively women, some influential residents there electing to support her struggle for professional recognition, among those the painter Lea von Littrow.

Her first private venture ended after the outbreak of the World War I which brought the end to tourism in Opatija. Jenko Groyer returned to Ljubljana and was entrusted vaccination against smallpox and later general medical service in the Grosuplje district. Her husband was enlisted as a military doctor in Pula. After the war, she again faced bureaucratic hurdles in the newly formed Kingdom of Serbs, Croats and Slovenes to have her degree recognized, and had to take extra exams at the University of Zagreb. Despite obtaining all the required formal qualifications, she was repeatedly rejected state employment, and had to work private practice. Records list her husband also working in Ljubljana at the beginning, but he disappears from the records in late 1920s, and his subsequent fate is unknown.

Jenko Groyer supplemented her income by writing for the women's magazine Ženski svet, publishing 18 articles on women's health between 1930 and 1935. Despite financial hardship, she helped the Ljubljana medical association with a loan for persecuted colleagues in the period leading up to World War II, then assisted the Liberation Front with free medical care and donations of medical supplies. After the war, she was again rejected employment despite the shortage of medical personnel, supposedly because of her pro-Russian orientation. She was nevertheless granted a state pension in 1953. She died in 1959 in Ljubljana.
