= Jenčo =

Jenčo is a Slovak surname. Notable people with the surname include:

- Lawrence Jenco (1934–1996), American Catholic priest and hostage
- Tomáš Jenčo (born 1988), Slovak football player
