= Ana Štěrba-Böhm =

Slovene chemist (1885–1936)

Ana Jenko Štěrba-Böhm
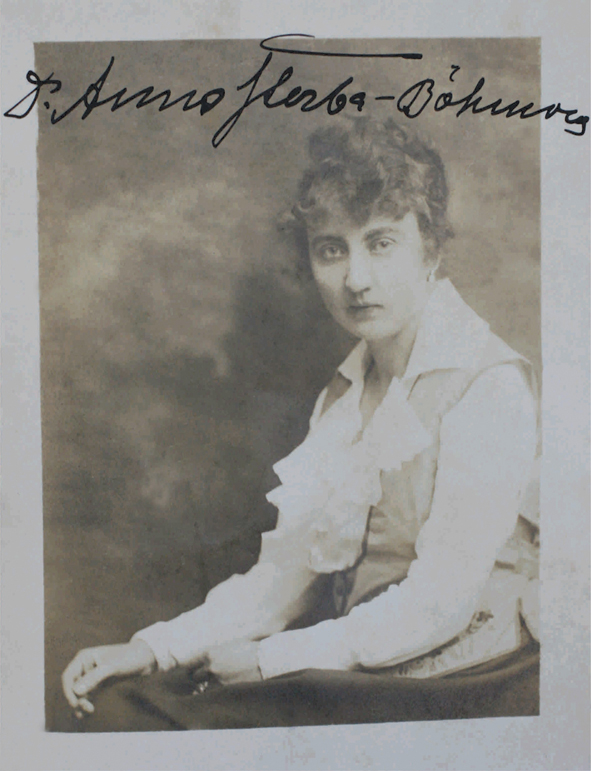
- Born: Ana Jenko; 9 June 1885; Ljubljana
- Died: 22 July 1936 (aged 51); Prague
- Education: Charles University
- Spouse: Jan Stanislav Štěrba-Böhm
- Children: Jan Peter Štěrba-Böhm
- Scientific career
- Fields: chemistry
- Thesis: Studie o stanovení a dělení kyselin: jantarové, jablečné a vinné (1911)

Ana Štěrba-Böhm (née Jenko; 9 June 1885 – 22 July 1936) was a Slovene chemist noted for being the first woman from the Slovene Lands to obtain a doctoral degree in chemistry.

== Early life and education ==
Ana Jenko was born in Ljubljana, then part of Austria-Hungary, to a highly educated family. Her father was the physician Ludvik Jenko and her mother Terezija Jenko (née Lenče) who was also an educated woman, having studied with Ursulines in Ljubljana and in Bavaria, as well as spending a year in Moscow. She assisted her husband in his practice, and the couple actively participated in Slovene cultural life as promoters of Pan-Slavism. They had four children. All siblings obtained higher education, most notably Ana's sister Eleonora who went on to become the first Slovene female physician.

Ana's early education is uncertain; she is said to have attended the 1st grammar school in Ljubljana as a private student, which was the only way for a direct enrollment at a university, since girls at that time were not permitted as regular students in grammar schools. After graduating, she enrolled in the study of philosophy at the philosophical faculty of the Charles-Ferdinand University in Prague in 1906, where she stated in the enrollment form that she had also attended higher courses for women at the St Petersburg University earlier.

For five semesters, she studied chemistry as an extraordinary student, then as a regular student. Among her teachers were Bohuslav Brauner (theoretical and physical chemistry), Bohumil Kužma (inorganic chemistry) and her later husband Jan Stanislav Štěrba-Böhm (history of chemistry), while also classes in mineralogy, experimental physics, mathematics, history of philosophy, Czech and German language were noted in her curriculum. She probably spent the 1911 summer semester preparing her doctoral thesis on the topic of determining and separating three organic acids: succinic, malic and tartaric acid.

On 22 July 1911, she received her doctorate from the Philosophical Faculty of the Carl-Ferdinand University in Prague (Czech branch) after major rigorosums in chemistry and physics, and minor in philosophy, with the thesis Studie o stanovení a dělení kyselin: jantarové, jablečné a vinné. This was noted by several contemporary Slovene newspapers and earned her the distinction of being the first Slovene woman to receive a doctorate in science.

== Later life ==
The following year, on 4 December 1912, Ana Jenko married her professor Jan Stanislav Štěrba-Böhm and took both his surnames, so she began using the name Ana (Anna) Štěrba-Böhm. Jan Stanislav, having completed his studies at the Sorbonne in Paris under Henri Moissan, Pierre Curie and Marie Curie at the turn of the century, likely arranged Ana's training in Marie Curie's laboratory. However, Ana Štěrba-Böhm did not pursue independent research after the marriage, but supported her husband's research on the properties of scandium. She was not signed as a co-author of the paper he published in 1914 in the journal Zeitschrift für Electrochemie und Angewandte Physikalische Chemie, as was common practice at the time, but her scientific contribution is attested in the acknowledgements section.

In 1914, their son Jan Peter was born. Jan Peter Štěrba-Böhm became a chemist as well and, like his mother, collaborated with his father on chemical studies. He received his PhD in chemistry in 1937. Ana Štěrba-Böhm died of cancer on 22 July 1936 in Prague, and is buried at the Vinohrady Cemetery there. Her husband died in 1938.
