= Civil Croatia =

Historical area of Central Croatia

Civil Croatia (Croatian: Civilna Hrvatska) was a designation for the areas of Central Croatia that were not part of the Habsburg Military Frontier. It was formed as part of the French-dominated Illyrian Provinces and disestablished in 1822 when it was given to the Kingdom of Croatia.

Civil Croatia was roughly coterminous with the modern Kajkavian-speaking areas of Croatia.

== See also ==
- Croatian Military Frontier

== Sources ==
- Dubravica, Branko (January 2002). "Političko-teritorijalna podjela i opseg civilne Hrvatske u godinama sjedinjenja s vojnom Hrvatskom 1871.-1886" [Political and territorial division and scope of Civil Croatia in the period of unification with the Croatian military frontier 1871–1886] (PDF). Politička misao (in Croatian). 38 (3): 159–172.
- Mužek, Matija (2020). "Kajkavian". In Greenberg, Marc L.; Grenoble, Lenore A. (eds.). Encyclopedia of Slavic Languages and Linguistics Online. Leiden: Brill. ISSN 2589-6229.
