= Kingdom of Illyria =

Crown land of Austria (1816–1849)

Coordinates: 46°03′N 14°30′E

Kingdom of Illyria Königreich Illyrien (German) Ilirsko kraljestvo (Slovene) Regno d'Illiria (Italian) Kraljevstvo Ilirija (Croatian)
- 1816–1849
- Flag Coat of arms

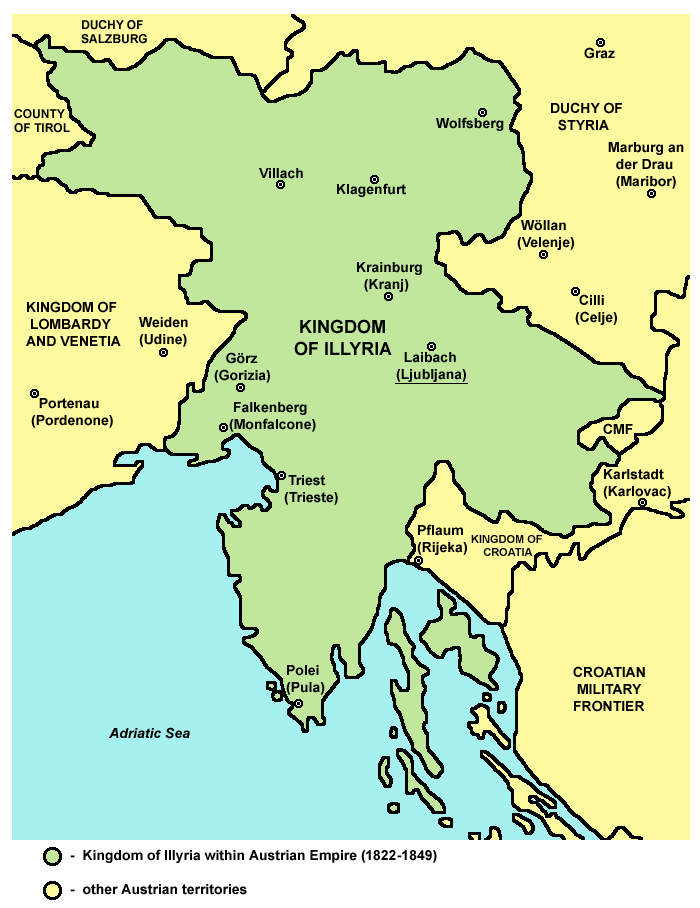
- The Kingdom of Illyria within the Austrian Empire (1822–1849)
- Status: Crown land of Austria
- Capital: Ljubljana
- Common languages: Italian; Slovene; Croatian; German
- Religion: Roman Catholic
- Government: Monarchy
- King
  - 1816–1835: Francis I
  - 1835–1848: Ferdinand I
  - 1848–1849: Francis Joseph I
- Statthalter
- Historical era: Modern history
  - Congress of Vienna: June 9, 1815
  - Established: August 3, 1816
  - Croatian territory detached: 1822
  - Revolution of 1848: 1849
  - Disestablished: December 8, 1849
- Currency: Thaler
Preceded by
Illyrian Provinces
Succeeded by
Duchy of Carniola
Duchy of Carinthia
Austrian Littoral
- Today part of: Austria; Croatia; Italy; Slovenia

The Kingdom of Illyria was a titular crown land of the Austrian Empire from 1816 to 1849, the successor state of the Napoleonic Illyrian Provinces, which were reconquered by Austria in the War of the Sixth Coalition. It was established according to the Final Act of the Vienna Congress. Its administrative centre was in Ljubljana (officially German: Laibach)

Upon the Revolutions of 1848, the kingdom was dissolved and split into the Austrian crown lands of Carniola, Carinthia, and the Austrian Littoral.

== Geography ==
The French Illyrian Provinces had comprised Carniola and western ("Upper") Carinthia as well as the Adriatic territories of Gorizia and Gradisca, Trieste and the Istrian peninsula. They had also included the Dalmatian coast and the lands of the Kingdom of Croatia south of the Sava River. Parts of the territories on the Adriatic Sea had been annexed by the Habsburg monarchy from Venice in the 1797 Treaty of Campo Formio. Upon the dissolution of the Provinces, the Austrian government split off Dalmatia and merged the eastern ("Lower") part of Carinthia into what was to become the Kingdom of Illyria.

The territory of the kingdom included the modern Austrian state of Carinthia and the western and central part of present-day Slovenia, i.e. Carniola with the capital Ljubljana, the Slovenian Littoral (Goriška and Slovenian Istria), and Slovenian Carinthia. It also included some territories in northwestern Croatia (present-day Istria County and the Kvarner Gulf islands of Krk, Cres and Lošinj) and northeastern Italy (eastern parts of the Friuli-Venezia Giulia region, i.e. the former Provinces of Trieste and Gorizia and some small parts of Udine around Tarvisio in the north east and Cervignano del Friuli in the south east). In 1822, Civil Croatia between the right bank of the Sava and Rijeka was again merged into the Habsburg Kingdom of Croatia.

== History ==
Until 1813, the territory was part of the French Illyrian Provinces. In August of that year, Austria joined the War of the Sixth Coalition against France. Austrian forces, commanded by Feldzeugmeister Christoph von Lattermann invaded Illyrian Provinces. In September (1813), Lattermann was appointed provisional civil and military governor of Illyria (German: Illyrien), a newly reconquered Austrian territory that was yet to be organized as a regular crown land.

The Kingdom of Illyria was finally formed in 1816 to counter the territorial pretenses of the Kingdom of Hungary and the influences of the Russian Empire, but it lost on its significance with the Hungarian annexation of Civil Croatia and Rijeka. The legal and administrative reforms made by the former French authorities deeply transformed the administrative structures of these territories, so the Austrian Imperial authorities thought it better to group most of them as a separate administrative entity, enabling a slow incorporation into the Austrian legal, judicial and administrative system.

After the collapse of Napoleon's France, the Austrian monarchs gained full power over the territory of the former French Illyrian provinces. The idea of the creation of the Illyrian Kingdom developed for foreign and domestic reasons. Foreign policy causes include an attempt to halt the spread of Italian and Russian influence, while domestic policy seeks to maintain some French reforms, retain Hungarian influence and the need for the Habsburg court to replace the postwar interim military administration as soon as possible.

Emperor Francis I and Chancellor Klemens von Metternich relied on the current administrative situation in the then abolished Illyrian provinces. But due to the Congress of Vienna, work in the former Illyrian provinces stalled. Nevertheless, a special Illyrian court organizational commission was formed (1814–1815); its work was completed by the court organizational commission (1815–1817). Despite the mistrust, the court took advantage of some local lawyers, such as the knight Leopold Plenčič and Ivan Vilhar, the former French chief in Villach. A well-developed plan for the reorganization of the administration was created. While the new administrative system was being secretly prepared with the help of Slovene lawyers, court policy had to face the action of the Croatian bishop of Zagreb Maksimilijan Vrhovac, who restored the old system in the northern part of civil Croatia, which was formerly part of the provinces.

On June 13, 1816, Emperor Francis I finally issued a decision to form a new political unit of the Illyrian Kingdom, and on August 3, 1816, he issued an imperial patent, with which this kingdom was finally established. Due to Croatian and Hungarian resistance, mainland Croatia was removed from the kingdom as early as 1822. On the other hand, due to the resistance of the local nobility, the whole of Carinthia did not really come into being a kingdom until 1825.

Although the kingdom was given a unified ecclesiastical order in 1830, it never gained real political power. The emperor's opposition to Metternich's idea of national chancellery initially prevented major changes, later the loss of Croatian lands led to a predominance of Slovene-speaking people, and from 1830 a Slovene-speaking metropolitan operated in Illyria. The Austrian court was afraid of uniting Slovene-speaking people, so as early as 1815 the Illyrian court's organizational commission made a proposal that the Ljubljana province (i.e., the higher administrative unit) should not be housed or that domestic (Slovene-speaking) domestic ones should be housed as little as possible.

Due to its marginal importance in the title of Austrian rulers, the Illyrian Kingdom has always appeared in the last place among the kingdoms, after Galicia and Lodomeria, from the very beginning. It existed as an administrative unit until 1849, but with the new constitution it was abolished in political terms and the old lands regained all crown provincial honors. The name of the Kingdom of Illyria has been appearing for some time now, mainly as a geographical term. Legally and formally, however, the Illyrian Kingdom continued to exist; until 1915, the emperor's patents contained the title of King of Illyria, and with the reform of October 10, 1915, the Illyrian coat of arms quietly disappeared from Austrian national heraldry.

The Kingdom of Illyria was officially established on August 3, 1816. It initially also included Croatian territory that was part of the Napoleonic Croatie civile. However, in the early 1820s the pre-Napoleonic Croatian kingdom was reestablished, which also included the territories which had formed part of the Kingdom of Illyria (the city of Rijeka/Fiume and the province of Karlovac).

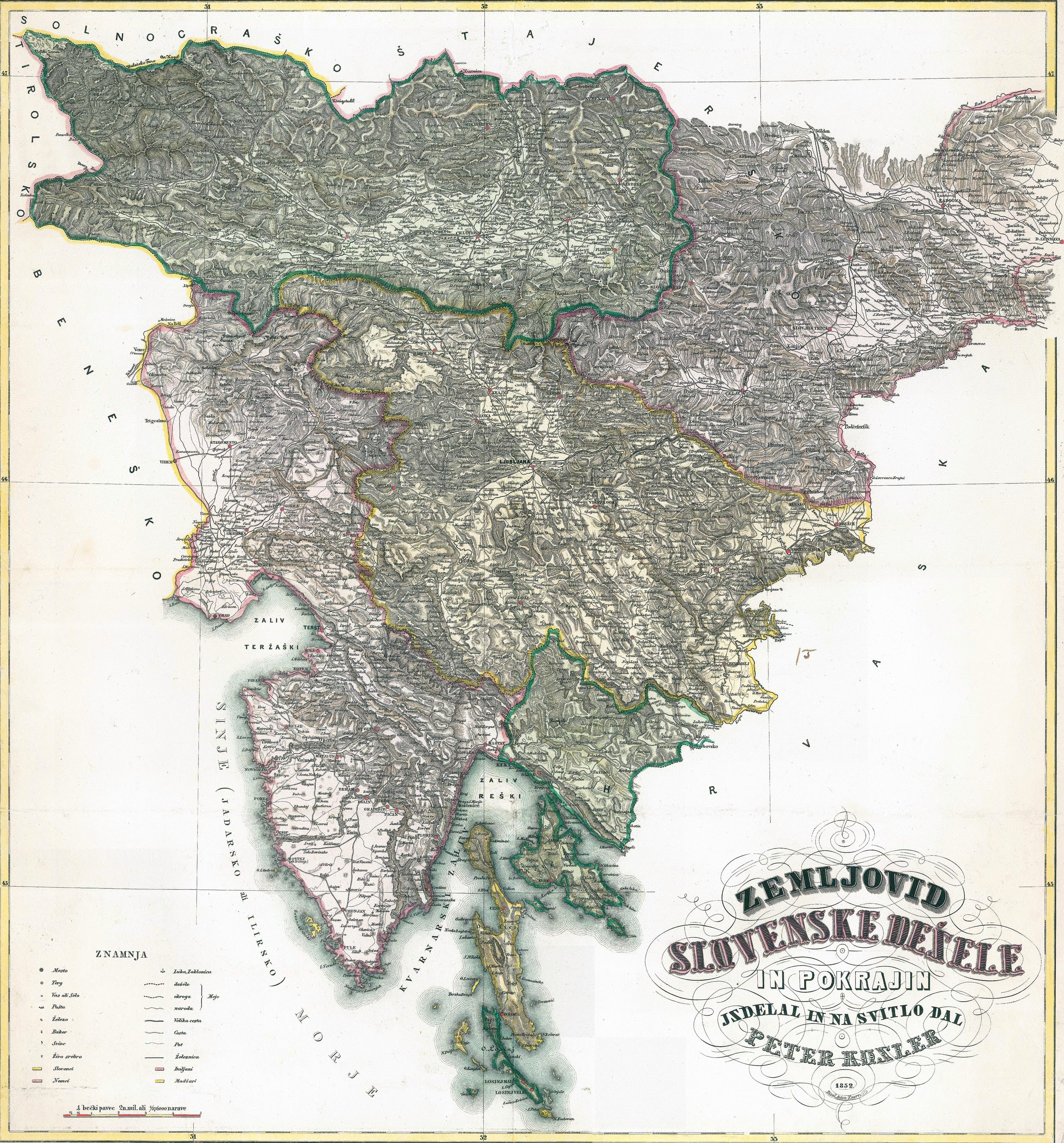
Map of the enlarged Kingdom of Illyria, entitled Zemljovid Slovenske dežele in pokrajin (Map of the Slovene Land and Provinces)

In the Spring of Nations in 1848, Slovenes advanced a proposal to include Lower Styria in the Kingdom of Illyria, so most of the ethnically Slovene lands would be united in a single administrative entity and the idea of a United Slovenia would thus be achieved. Peter Kosler designed a map of such an enlarged Kingdom of Illyria, which would later become an important national symbol in Slovenian national consciousness. The proposal was, however, rejected by the Habsburg emperor. The Kingdom of Illyria was gradually mentioned less and less, and officially appeared for the last time in 1849 as a crown land in the March Constitution of Austria.

== Administration ==
Illyria was administratively divided into two Imperial-Royal 'Governments' (Latin: Gubernia, German: Gouvernements): Laibach (Ljubljana; spelled Laybach in earlier documents) and Triest (Trieste); each of these was subdivided into Kreise (lit. 'circles').

- Gouvernement Laibach, also referred to as Ober-Illyrien (Upper Illyria), was divided into
  - Laibacher Kreis (Ljubljana): Upper Carniola
  - Neustädter Kreis (Novo Mesto): Lower Carniola
  - Adelsberger Kreis (Postojna): Inner Carniola
  - Villacher Kreis: Upper Carinthia (roughly the area held by Napoleon 1809–1814)
  - Klagenfurter Kreis: Lower Carinthia
- Gouvernement Triest, also referred to as the Küstenland (Littoral) or Unter-Illyrien (Lower Illyria), was from 1822 divided into
  - Mitterburger Kreis (Pazin) or Istrier Kreis; sometimes simply Istrien; became the Margraviate of Istria in 1849
  - Görzer Kreis (Gorizia), sometimes called "Austrian Friuli"; became the Princely County of Gorizia and Gradisca in 1849
  - the imperial city of Triest

The post-1822 subdivisions of the Littoral persisted until 1918.

Prior to the separation of the Croatian lands in 1822 Gouvernement Triest had consisted of:

- Görzer Kreis: the northern part of the post-1822 Kreis
- Fiumaner Kreis (Fiume/Rijeka): the area surrounding the Kvarner Gulf, i.e. eastern Istria, western Croatia (equivalent to the earlier Processus Montanus with the Hungarian Littoral, and to the later Rijeka County) and the various Adriatic islands
- Karlstädter Kreis (Karlovac; contemporarily spelled Carlstadt/Carlstädter): the rest of Illyrian Croatia
- Triester Kreis, which excluded the city itself, comprised western Istria and the southern part of the post-1822 Görzer Kreis, including all of its coastline.
- the city of Triest

== List of governors ==
- 1816–1817: Bernhard Anton Maria Vincenz, Freiherr von Rossetti zu Roseneck
- 1817–1818: Karl Graf Chotek von Chotkow and Wognin
- 1818–1823: Antonio Spiegelfeld
- 1823–1835: Prince Alfonso Gabriele Porcia
- 1835–1841: Joseph von Weingarten
- 1841–1847: Franz von Stadion
- 1847–1848: Franz von Gyulai
- 1848–1849: Roberto Algravio di Salam
- 1849: Major General Joseph Wenzel Ritter von Standeisky
- 1849: Franz Wimpffen

== See also ==
- Illyria
- Illyrian movement

== Sources ==
- Costa, Heinrich (1855). "Biographie des k. k. Civil- und Militär- Gouverneurs Freiherrn von Lattermann". Mittheilungen des historischen Vereins für Krain. 10: 5–7.
- Haas, Arthur G. (1963). Metternich, Reorganization and Nationality, 1813–1818: A Story of Foresight and Frustration in the Rebuilding of the Austrian Empire. Wiesbaden: Franz Steiner Verlag. ISBN 9783515009980.
- Siemann, Wolfram (2019). Metternich: Strategist and Visionary. Cambridge: Harvard University Press. ISBN 978-0-674-74392-2.
