= Habsburg monarchy =

Monarchy in Europe (1282–1918)

Habsburg monarchy Monarchia Austriaca (Latin) Habsburgermonarchie (German)
- 1282–1918
- Top: 1804–1918; Bottom: c.1452–1804 Middle common coat of arms of 1866–1915 Coat of arms since the late 13th century.
- Motto: A.E.I.O.U. Austriae est imperare orbi universo (Latin) "All the world is subject to Austria"
- The Habsburg monarchy on the eve of the French Revolution, 1789
- Capital: Vienna
- Religion: Roman Catholicism (official)
- Government: Monarchy
- Monarch
  - 1282–1291: Rudolf I (Note: First monarch as king of Germany.)
  - 1452–1493: Frederick III (Note: First Holy Roman Emperor of the Habsburg dynasty.)
  - 1508–1519: Maximilian I
  - 1519–1556: Charles V (Note: Last monarch of a uniform House of Habsburg.)
  - 1556–1598: Philip II (Note: First ruler of the Spanish branch of a divided Habsburg dynasty.)
  - 1556–1564: Ferdinand I (Note: First ruler of the Austrian branch of a divided Habsburg dynasty.)
  - 1665–1700: Charles II (Note: Last ruler of the Spanish branch.)
  - 1740–1780: Maria Theresa
  - 1780–1790: Joseph II
  - 1792–1835: Francis II (Note: Last Holy Roman Emperor and, as Francis I, first emperor of Austria.)
  - 1848–1916: Franz Joseph I
  - 1916–1918: Charles I (Note: Final monarch of the House of Habsburg.)
- Historical era: Middle Ages; Early modern; Late modern
  - Established: 1282
  - Rudolf I grants Austria and Styria to his sons: 1282
  - Acquisition of Carinthia and Tyrol: 1335–1363
  - Acquisition of the Low Countries: 1477
  - Acquisition of Bohemia and Hungary: 1526
  - Abdication of Charles V: 1556
  - Battle of Vienna & Treaty of Karlowitz: 1683–1699
  - War of the Spanish Succession: 1713–1714
  - Disestablished: 1918
Preceded by
Habsburg Hereditary Lands
Spanish Netherlands
Duchy of Mantua
Lands of the Bohemian Crown
Lands of the Hungarian Crown
Kingdom of Croatia
Polish–Lithuanian Commonwealth
Sanjak of Smederevo
Succeeded by
German-Austria
Hungary
Czechoslovakia
State of Slovenes, Croats and Serbs

The Habsburg monarchy, (Note: English: /ˈhæpsbɜːrɡ/ HAPS-burg; German: Habsburgermonarchie, pronounced [ˈhaːpsbʊʁɡɐmonaʁˌçiː].) also known as the Habsburg Empire, Habsburg Realm, (Note: German: Habsburgerreich [ˈhaːpsbʊʁɡɐˌʁaɪç].) or Danube Monarchy, (Note: German: Donaumonarchie [ˈdoːnaʊmonaʁˌçiː].) was the collection of empires, kingdoms, duchies, counties and other polities (composite monarchy) that were ruled by the House of Habsburg. From 1804 onward it was referred to as the Austrian Empire, and from 1867 onward as Austria-Hungary.

The history of the Habsburg monarchy can be traced back to the election of Rudolf I as King of Germany in 1273 and his acquisition of the Duchy of Austria for the Habsburgs in 1282. In 1482, Maximilian I acquired the Netherlands through marriage. Both realms passed to his grandson and successor, Charles V, who also inherited the Spanish throne and its colonial possessions, and thus came to rule the Habsburg empire at its greatest territorial extent. The abdication of Charles V in 1556 led to a division within the dynasty between his son Philip II of Spain and his brother Ferdinand I, who had served as his lieutenant and the elected king of Hungary, Croatia and Bohemia. The Spanish branch (which held all of Iberia, the Netherlands, and lands in Italy) became extinct in the male line in 1700, but continued through the female line through the House of Bourbon. The Austrian branch (which ruled the Holy Roman Empire, Hungary, Bohemia and various other lands) was itself split into different branches in 1564 but reunited 101 years later. It became extinct in the male line in 1740, but continued through the female line as the House of Habsburg-Lorraine.

The Habsburg monarchy was a union of crowns, with only partial shared laws and institutions other than the Habsburg court itself; the provinces were divided in three groups: the Archduchy proper, Inner Austria that included Styria and Carniola, and Further Austria with Tyrol and the Swabian lands. The territorial possessions of the monarchy were thus united only by virtue of a common monarch. The Habsburg realms were unified in 1804 with the formation of the Austrian Empire and later split in two as Austria-Hungary with the Austro-Hungarian Compromise of 1867. The monarchy began to fracture in the face of inevitable defeat during the final years of World War I and ultimately disbanded with proclamation of the State of Slovenes, Croats and Serbs, the Republic of German-Austria and the First Hungarian Republic in late 1918.

In historiography, the terms Austria or Austrians are frequently used as shorthand for the Habsburg monarchy since the 18th century. From 1438 to 1806, the rulers of the House of Habsburg almost continuously reigned as Holy Roman Emperors. However, the realms of the Holy Roman Empire were mostly self-governing and are thus not considered to have been part of the Habsburg monarchy. Hence, the Habsburg monarchy (of the Austrian branch) is often called Austria by metonymy. Around 1700, the Latin term monarchia austriaca came into use as a term of convenience. Within the empire alone, the vast possessions included the original Hereditary Lands, the Erblande, from before 1526; the Lands of the Bohemian Crown; the formerly Spanish Austrian Netherlands from 1714 until 1794; and some fiefs in Imperial Italy. Outside the empire, they encompassed all the Kingdom of Hungary as well as conquests made at the expense of the Ottoman Empire. The dynastic capital was Vienna, except from 1583 to 1611, when it was in Prague.

== Origins and expansion ==
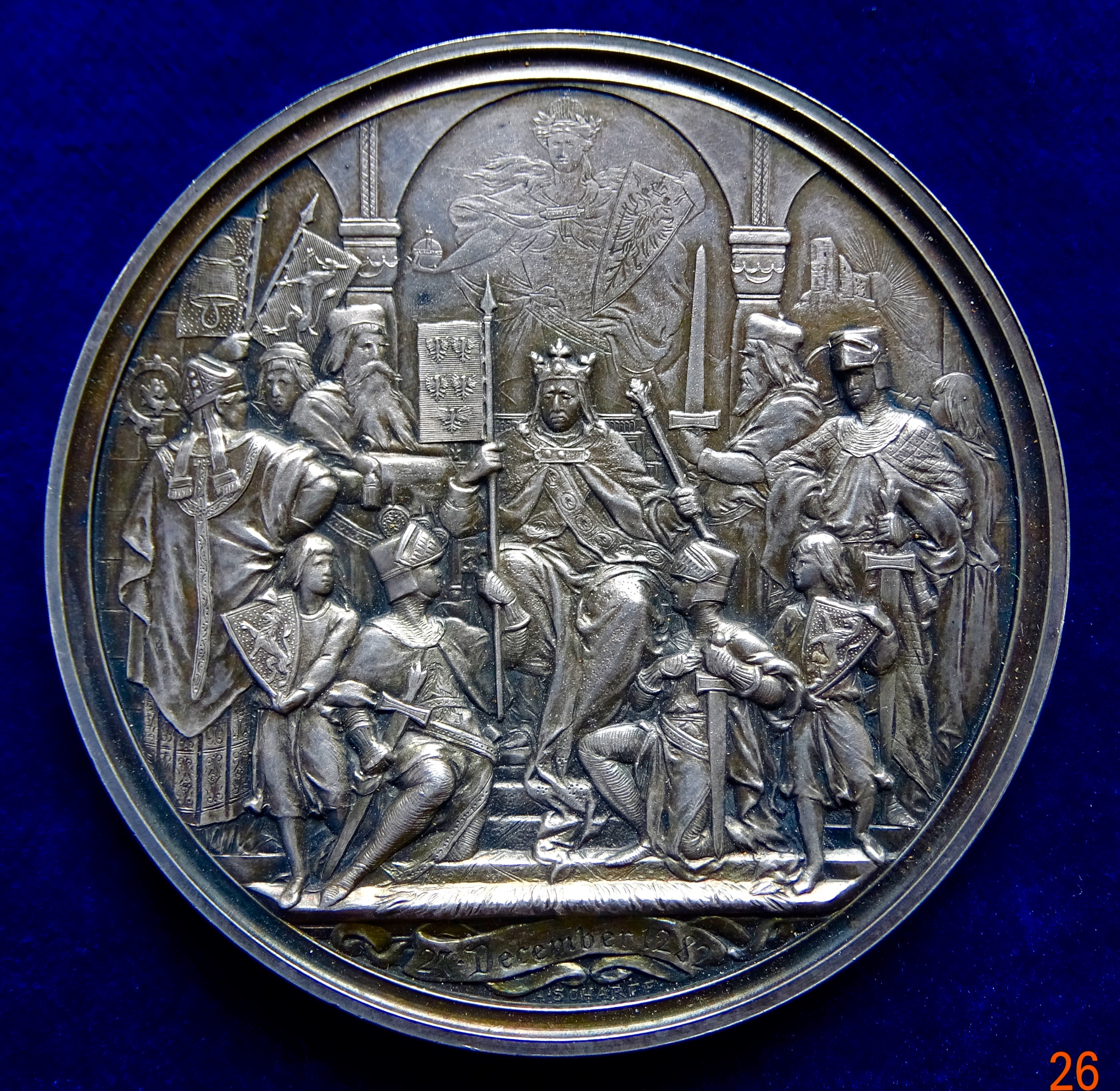
Silver medallion depicting King Rudolf I with his sons Albert and Rudolf II at the Diet of Augsburg, which laid the foundation of the House of Habsburg. Work by Anton Scharff for the 600th anniversary of the constitution of the Erblande, 1882.

The first Habsburg who can be reliably traced was Radbot of Klettgau, who was born in the late 10th century; the family name originated with Habsburg Castle, in present-day Switzerland, which was built by Radbot. After 1279, the Habsburgs came to rule in the Duchy of Austria, which was part of the elective Kingdom of Germany within the Holy Roman Empire. King Rudolf I of Germany of the Habsburg family assigned the Duchy of Austria to his sons at the Diet of Augsburg (1282), thus establishing the "Austrian hereditary lands". From that moment, the Habsburg dynasty was also known as the House of Austria. Between 1438 and 1806, with few exceptions, the Habsburg Archduke of Austria was elected as Holy Roman Emperor.

The Habsburgs grew to European prominence as a result of the dynastic policy pursued by Maximilian I, Holy Roman Emperor. Maximilian married Mary of Burgundy, thus bringing the Burgundian Netherlands into the Habsburg possessions. Their son, Philip the Handsome, married Joanna the Mad of Spain (daughter of Ferdinand II of Aragon and Isabella I of Castile). Charles V, Holy Roman Emperor, the son of Philip and Joanna, inherited the Habsburg Netherlands in 1506, Habsburg Spain and its territories in 1516, and Habsburg Austria in 1519.

At this point, the Habsburg possessions were so vast that Charles V was constantly travelling throughout his dominions and therefore needed deputies and regents, such as Isabella of Portugal in Spain and Margaret of Austria in the Low Countries, to govern his various realms. At the Diet of Worms in 1521, Emperor Charles V came to terms with his younger brother Ferdinand. According to the Habsburg compact of Worms (1521), confirmed a year later in Brussels, Ferdinand was made Archduke, as a regent of Charles V in the Austrian hereditary lands.

Following the death of Louis II of Hungary in the Battle of Mohács against the Ottoman Turks, Archduke Ferdinand (who was his brother-in-law by virtue of an adoption treaty signed by Maximilian and Vladislaus II, Louis's father at the First Congress of Vienna) was also elected the next king of Bohemia and Hungary in 1526. Bohemia and Hungary became hereditary Habsburg domains only in the 17th century: Following victory in the Battle of White Mountain (1620) over the Bohemian rebels, Ferdinand II promulgated a Renewed Land Ordinance (1627/1628) that established hereditary succession over Bohemia. Following the Battle of Mohács (1687), in which Leopold I reconquered almost all of Ottoman Hungary from the Turks, the emperor held a diet in Pressburg to establish hereditary succession in the Hungarian kingdom.

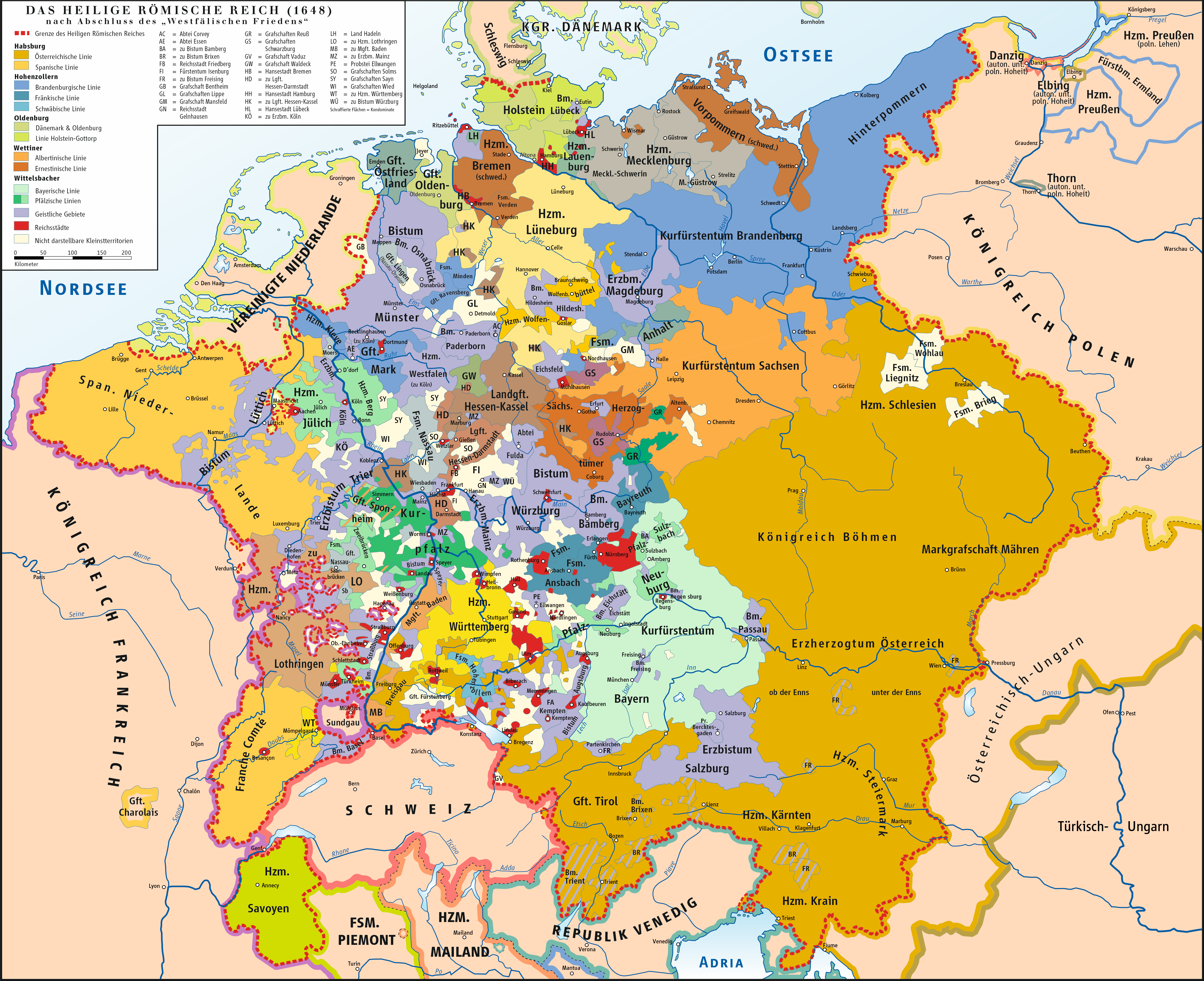
Map of Central Europe in 1648: Territories under the Holy Roman Empire, comprising the Alpine heartland (Erblande) of the Habsburg monarchy.

Charles V divided the House in 1556 by ceding Austria along with the Imperial crown to Ferdinand (as decided at the Imperial election, 1531), and the Spanish Empire to his son Philip. The Spanish branch (which also held the Netherlands, the Kingdom of Portugal between 1580 and 1640, and the Mezzogiorno of Italy) became extinct in 1700. The Austrian branch (which also ruled the Holy Roman Empire, Hungary and Bohemia) was itself divided between different branches of the family from 1564 until 1665, but thereafter it remained a single personal union. It became extinct in the male line in 1740, but through the marriage of Queen Maria Theresa with Francis of Lorraine, the dynasty continued as the House of Habsburg-Lorraine.

=== Names ===
- Habsburg monarchy (German Habsburgermonarchie): this is an unofficial umbrella term, very frequently used, but was not an official name.
- Austrian monarchy (Latin: monarchia austriaca) came into use around 1700 as a term of convenience for the Habsburg territories.
- "Danubian monarchy" (German: Donaumonarchie) was an unofficial name often used contemporaneously.
- "Dual monarchy" (German: Doppel-Monarchie) referred to the combination of Cisleithania and the Transleithania, two states under one crowned ruler.
- Austrian Empire (German: Kaisertum Österreich): This was the official name of the new Habsburg empire created in 1804, immediately prior to the Holy Roman Empire being dissolved in 1806. In this context, the English word empire refers to a territory ruled by an emperor, and not to a "widespreading domain".
- Austria-Hungary (German: Österreich-Ungarn), 1867–1918: This name was commonly used in international relations, although the official name was Austro-Hungarian Monarchy (German: Österreichisch-Ungarische Monarchie).
- Crownlands or crown lands (Kronländer) (1849–1918): This is the name of all the individual parts of the Austrian Empire (1849–1867), and then of Austria-Hungary from 1867 on. The Kingdom of Hungary (more exactly the Lands of the Hungarian Crown) was not considered a "crownland" anymore after the establishment of Austria-Hungary in 1867, so that the "crownlands" became identical with what was called the Kingdoms and Lands represented in the Imperial Council (Die im Reichsrate vertretenen Königreiche und Länder).
- The Hungarian parts of the empire were called "Lands of the Crown of Saint Stephen" or "Lands of Holy (St.) Stephen's Crown" (Länder der Heiligen Stephans Krone). The Bohemian (Czech) Lands were called "Lands of the St. Wenceslaus' Crown" (Länder der Wenzels-Krone).

Names of some smaller territories:

- The Prince-Archbishopric of Salzburg finally became Austrian in 1816 after the Napoleonic wars; before that it was ruled by the prince-archbishops of Salzburg as a sovereign territory.
- The Prince-Bishopric of Trent and Prince-Bishopric of Brixen became Austrian in 1803 following the Treaty of Lunéville.
- Austria, historically, was split into "Austria above the Enns" and "Austria below the Enns" (the Enns river is the state-border between Upper- and Lower Austria). Upper Austria was enlarged after the Treaty of Teschen (1779) following the War of the Bavarian Succession by the so-called Innviertel ("Inn Quarter"), formerly part of Bavaria.
- Hereditary Lands (Erblande or Erbländer; mostly used Österreichische Erblande) or German Hereditary Lands (in the Austrian monarchy) or Austrian Hereditary Lands (Middle Ages – 1849/1918): In a narrower sense these were the "original" Habsburg territories, principally the Archduchy of Austria (Oesterreich), Duchy of Styria (Steiermark), Duchy of Carinthia (Kaernten), Duchy of Carniola (Krain), County of Tyrol (Tirol) and Vorarlberg. In a wider sense the Lands of the Bohemian Crown were also included (from 1526; definitively from 1620/27) in the Hereditary Lands. The term was replaced by the term "Crownlands" (see above) in the 1849 March Constitution, but it was also used afterwards.
  The Erblande also included many small territories that were principalities, duchies or counties in other parts of the Holy Roman Empire, such as Further Austria.

== Territories ==
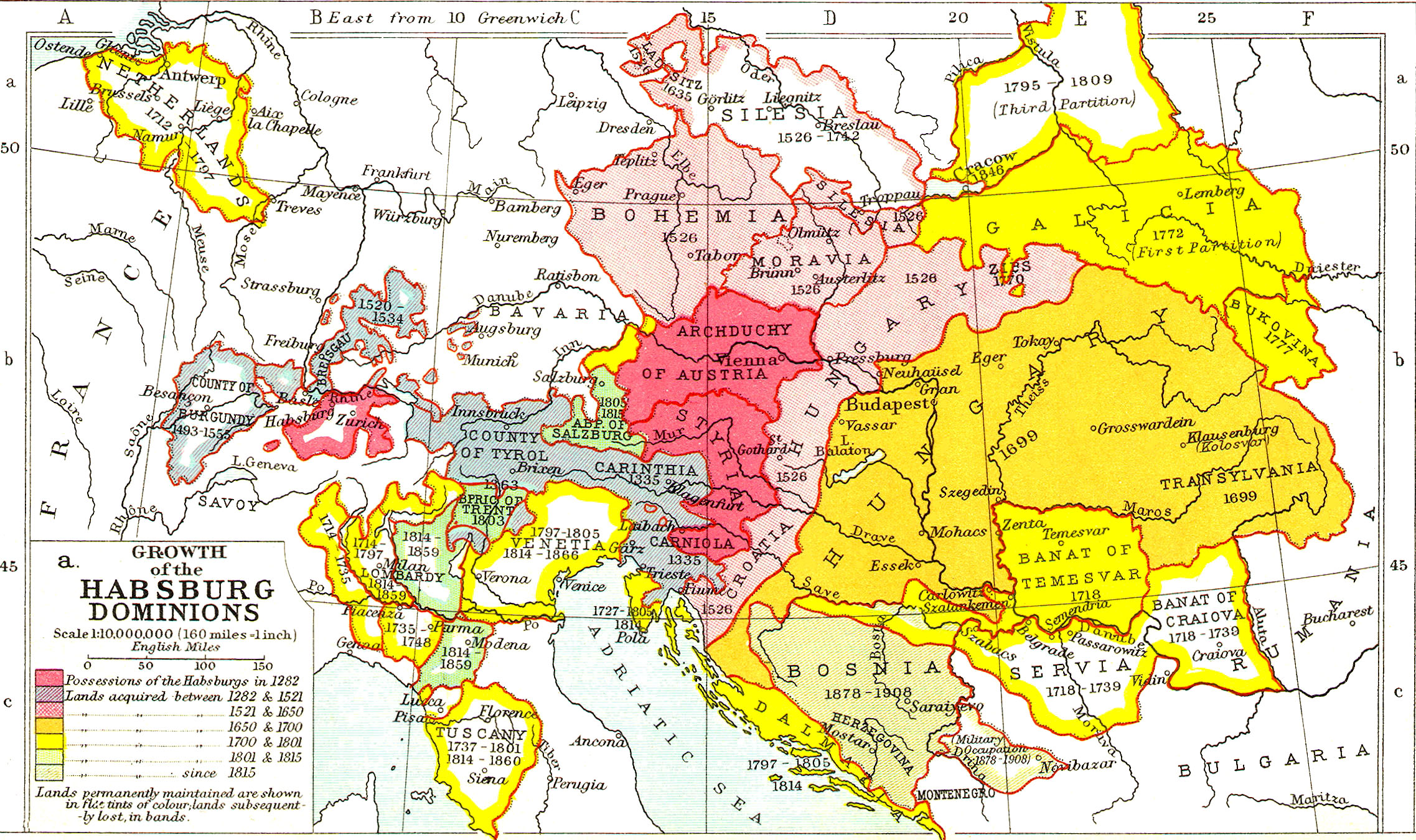
Growth of the Habsburg monarchy in central Europe

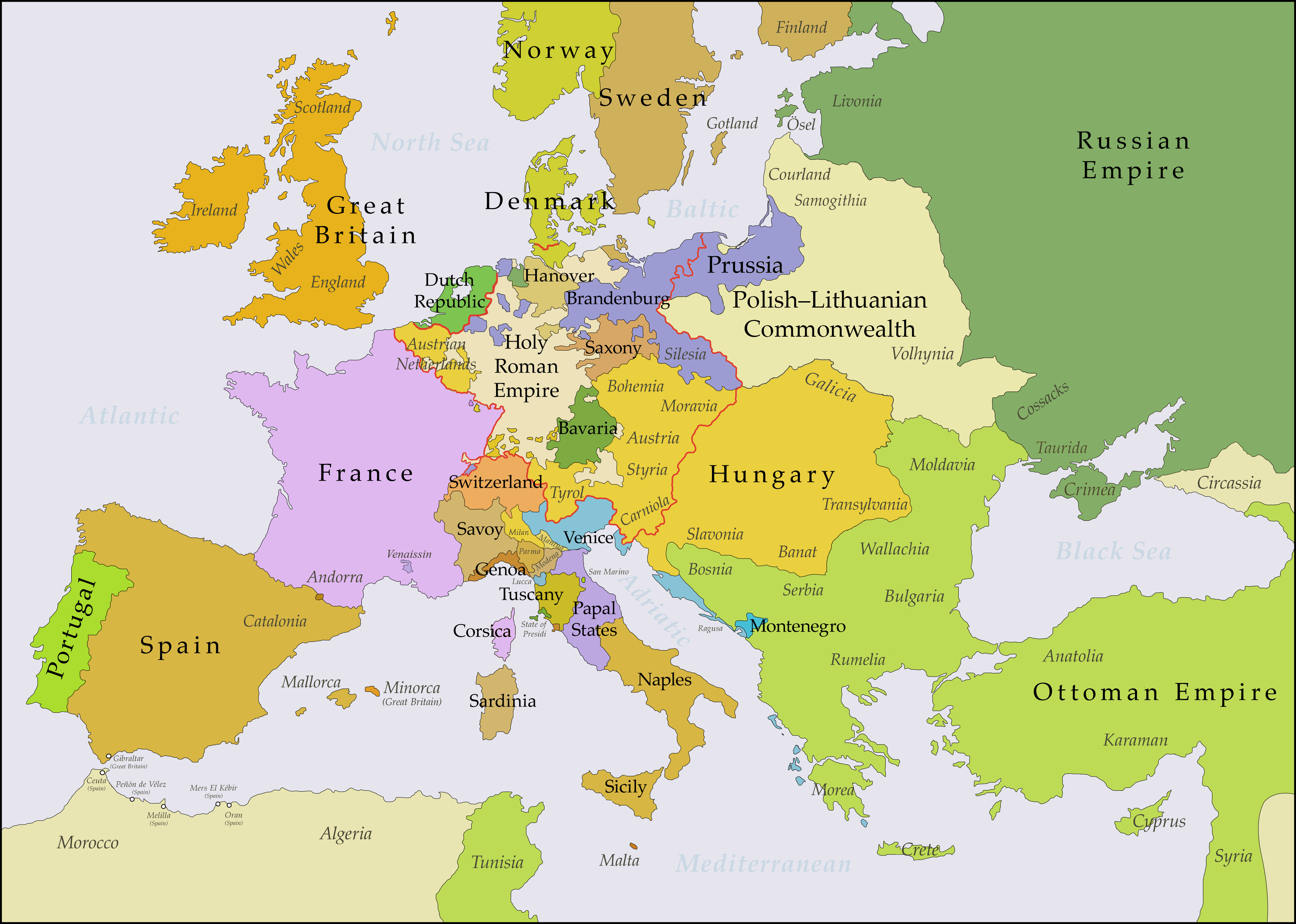
The Habsburg monarchy at the time of Joseph II's death in 1790. The red line marks the borders of the Holy Roman Empire.

The territories ruled by the Austrian monarchy changed over the centuries, but the core always consisted of four blocs:

- The Hereditary Lands, which covered most of the modern states of Austria and Slovenia, as well as territories in northeastern Italy and (before 1797) southwestern Germany. To these were added in 1779 the Inn Quarter of Bavaria and in 1803 the Prince-Bishoprics of Trent and Brixen. The Napoleonic Wars caused disruptions where many parts of the Hereditary lands were lost, but all these, along with the former Prince-Archbishopric of Salzburg, which had previously been temporarily annexed between 1805 and 1809, were recovered at the Congress of Vienna 1815, with the exception of Further Austria. The Hereditary provinces included:
  - Archduchy of Austria
    - Upper Austria
    - Lower Austria
  - Inner Austria
    - Duchy of Styria
    - Duchy of Carinthia
    - Duchy of Carniola
    - The Imperial Free City of Trieste
    - Margraviate of Istria (although much of Istria was Venetian territory until 1797)
    - Princely County of Gorizia and Gradisca
  - County of Tyrol (although the Bishoprics of Trent and Brixen dominated what would become the South Tyrol before 1803
  - Duchy of Salzburg
  - Further Austria, mostly ruled jointly with Tyrol.
    - Vorarlberg (actually a collection of provinces, only united in the 19th century)
    - The Vorlande, a group of territories in Breisgau and elsewhere in southwestern Germany lost in 1801 (although the Alsatian territories (Sundgau) which had formed a part of it had been lost as early as 1648)
  - Grand Duchy of Salzburg (only after 1805)
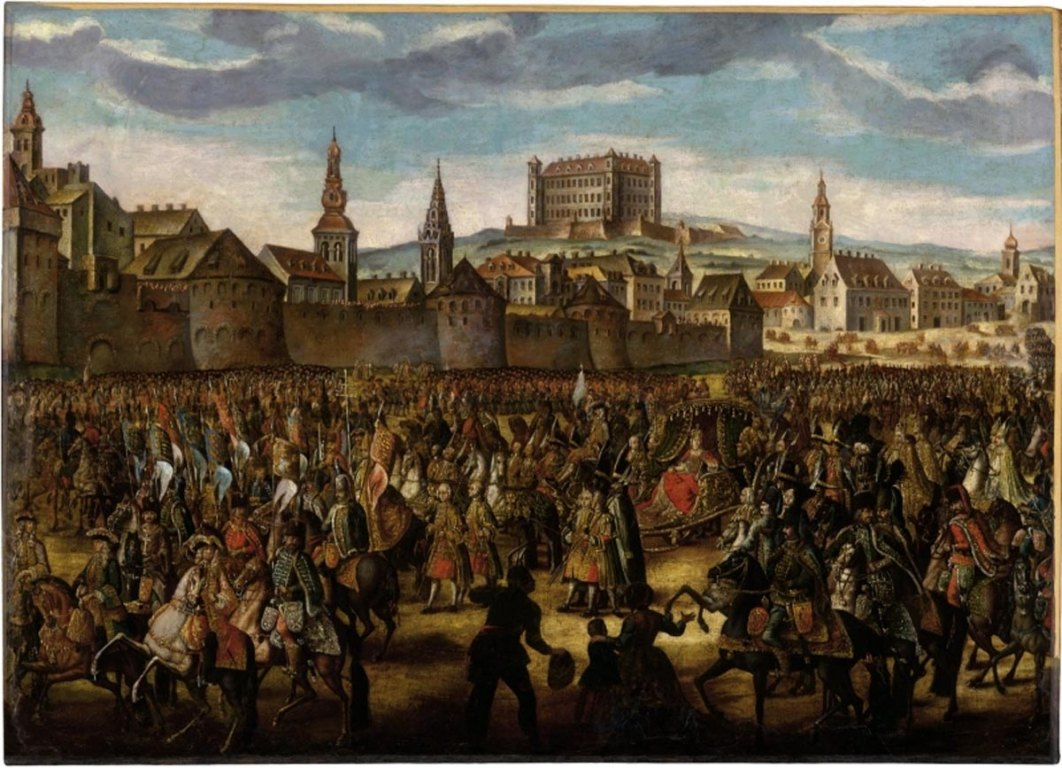
    Coronation of Maria Theresa in Pressburg, Kingdom of Hungary, 1741
- The Lands of the Bohemian Crown. The Bohemian Diet elected Ferdinand, later Holy Roman Emperor Ferdinand I, as king in 1526. Initially consisting of the five lands:
  - Kingdom of Bohemia
  - Margraviate of Moravia
  - Silesia, Most of Silesia was conquered by Prussia in 1740–1742 and the remnants which stayed under Habsburg sovereignty were ruled as Duchy of Upper and Lower Silesia (Austrian Silesia).
  - Lusatia, was ceded to Saxony in 1635.
    - Upper Lusatia
    - Lower Lusatia
- The Kingdom of Hungary – two-thirds of the former territory that was administered by the medieval Kingdom of Hungary was conquered by the Ottoman Empire and the Princes of vassal Ottoman Transylvania, while the Habsburg administration was restricted to the western and northern territories of the former kingdom, which remained to be officially referred as the Kingdom of Hungary. In 1699, at the end of the Ottoman–Habsburg wars, one part of the territories that were administered by the former medieval Kingdom of Hungary came under Habsburg administration, with some other areas being acquired in 1718 (some of the territories that were part of medieval kingdom, notably those in the south of the Sava and Danube rivers, remained under Ottoman administration).
- Kingdom of Croatia
- Military Frontier

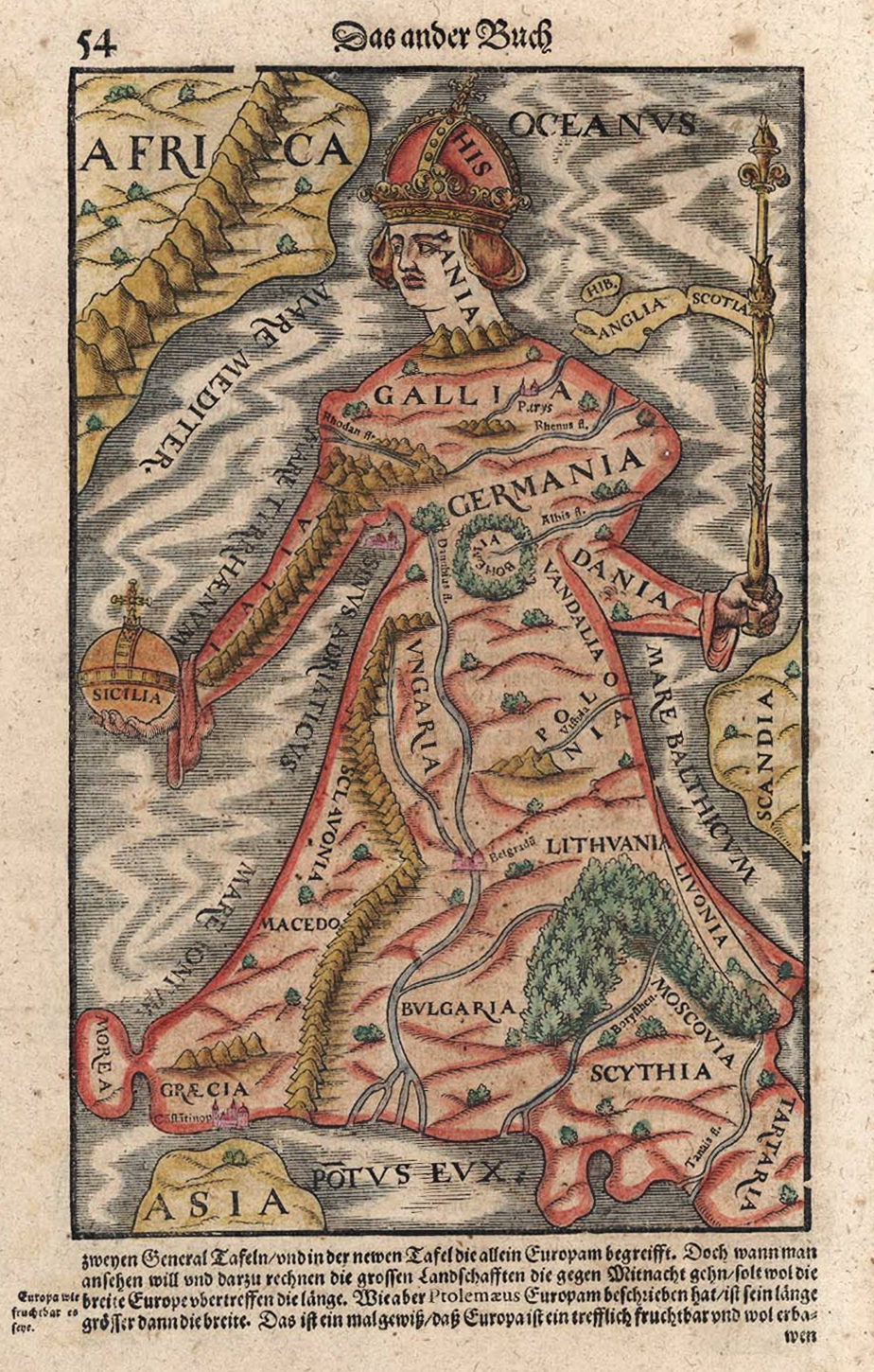
Europa regina, symbolizing a Habsburg-dominated Europe

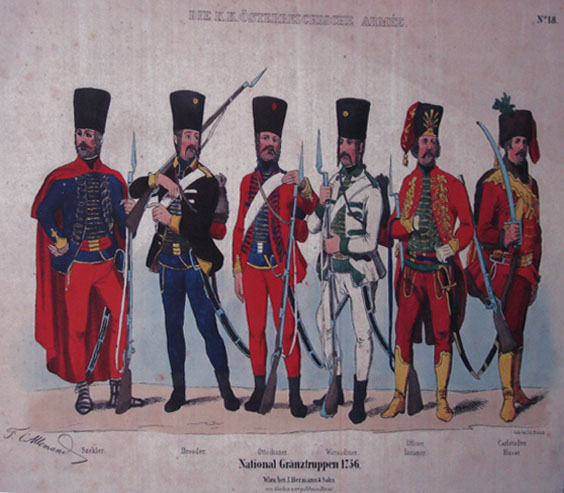
Soldiers of the Military Frontier against the incursions of the Ottoman Turks, 1756

Over the course of its history, other lands were, at times, under Austrian Habsburg rule (some of these territories were secundogenitures, i.e. ruled by other lines of Habsburg dynasty):

- Serbia occupation (1686–1691)
- Kingdom of Slavonia (1699–1868)
- Duchy of Milan (1706–1797)
- Duchy of Mantua (1706–1797)
- Kingdom of Naples (1707–1735)
- Kingdom of Sardinia (1707–1720)
- State of the Presidi (1707–1733)
- Austrian Netherlands, consisting of most of modern Belgium and Luxembourg (1713–1795)
- Grand Principality of Transylvania, between 1699 (Treaty of Karlowitz) and 1867 (Austro-Hungarian Compromise of 1867)
- Kingdom of Serbia (1718–1739)
- Banat of Temeswar (1718–1778)
- Banat of Craiova (1718–1739 de facto, 1716–1737)
- Kingdom of Sicily (1720–1735)
- Duchy of Parma and Piacenza (1735–1748)
- Kingdom of Galicia and Lodomeria, in modern Poland and Ukraine (1772–1918)
- Duchy of Bukovina (1774–1918)
- Serbia occupation (1788–1791)
- West Galicia, the Polish lands, including Kraków, taken in the Third Partition (1795–1809)
- Venetia (1797–1805)
- Kingdom of Dalmatia (1797–1805, 1814–1918)
- Kingdom of Lombardy–Venetia (1814–1866)
- Grand Duchy of Kraków, which was incorporated into Galicia (1846–1918)
- Serbian Vojvodina (1848–1849) de facto entity, officially unrecognized
- Voivodeship of Serbia and Banat of Temeschwar (1849–1860)
- Kingdom of Croatia-Slavonia (1868–1918)
- Sanjak of Novi Pazar occupation (1878–1908)
- Austro-Hungarian rule in Bosnia and Herzegovina (1878–1918)

The boundaries of some of these territories varied over the period indicated, and others were ruled by a subordinate (secundogeniture) Habsburg line. The Habsburgs also held the title of Holy Roman Emperor between 1438 and 1740, and again from 1745 to 1806.

=== Characteristics ===
Imperial coat of arms of the Austro-Hungarian Empire, used between the years 1815–1866 and 1867–1915.

Within the early modern Habsburg monarchy, each entity was governed according to its own particular customs. Until the mid-17th century, not all of the provinces were even necessarily ruled by the same person—junior members of the family often ruled portions of the Hereditary Lands as private apanages. Serious attempts at centralization began under Maria Theresa and especially her son Joseph II, Holy Roman Emperor in the mid to late 18th century, but many of these were abandoned following large scale resistance to Joseph's more radical reform attempts, although a more cautious policy of centralization continued during the revolutionary period and the Metternichian period that followed.

Another attempt at centralization began in 1849 following the suppression of the various revolutions of 1848. For the first time, ministers tried to transform the monarchy into a centralized bureaucratic state ruled from Vienna. The Kingdom of Hungary was placed under martial law, being divided into a series of military districts, and the Diet of Hungary was forced to dissolve after the revolution was suppressed by Austrian troops under the command of Julius Jacob von Haynau. Following the Habsburg defeats in the Second Italian War of Independence (1859) and Austro-Prussian War (1866), these policies were gradually abandoned.

After experimentation in the early 1860s, the famous Austro-Hungarian Compromise of 1867 was arrived at, by which the so-called dual monarchy of Austria-Hungary was set up. In this system, the Kingdom of Hungary ("Lands of the Holy Hungarian Crown of St. Stephen.") was an equal sovereign with only a personal union and a joint foreign and military policy connecting it to the other Habsburg lands. Although the non-Hungarian Habsburg lands were referred to as "Austria", received their own central parliament (the Reichsrat, or Imperial Council) and ministries, as their official name – the "Kingdoms and Lands Represented in the Imperial Council". When Bosnia and Herzegovina was annexed (after 30 years of occupation and administration), it was not incorporated into either half of the monarchy. Instead, it was governed by the joint Ministry of Finance.

During the dissolution of Austria-Hungary, the Austrian territories collapsed under the weight of the various ethnic independence movements that came to the fore with its defeat in World War I. After its dissolution, the new republics of Austria (the German-Austrian territories of the Hereditary lands) and the First Hungarian Republic were created. In the peace settlement that followed, significant territories were ceded to Romania and Italy and the remainder of the monarchy's territory was shared out among the new states of Poland, the Kingdom of Serbs, Croats and Slovenes (later Yugoslavia), and Czechoslovakia.

== Other lines ==
A junior line ruled over the Grand Duchy of Tuscany between 1765 and 1801, and again from 1814 to 1859. While exiled from Tuscany, this line ruled at Salzburg from 1803 to 1805, and in Grand Duchy of Würzburg from 1805 to 1814. The House of Austria-Este ruled the Duchy of Modena from 1814 to 1859, while Empress Marie Louise, Napoleon's second wife and the daughter of Austrian Emperor Francis I, ruled over the Duchy of Parma and Piacenza between 1814 and 1847. Also, the Second Mexican Empire, from 1863 to 1867, was headed by Maximilian I of Mexico, the brother of Emperor Franz Josef of Austria.

== Rulers, 1508–1918 ==
The so-called "Habsburg monarchs" or "Habsburg emperors" held many different titles and ruled each kingdom separately through a personal union.

=== House of Habsburg ===
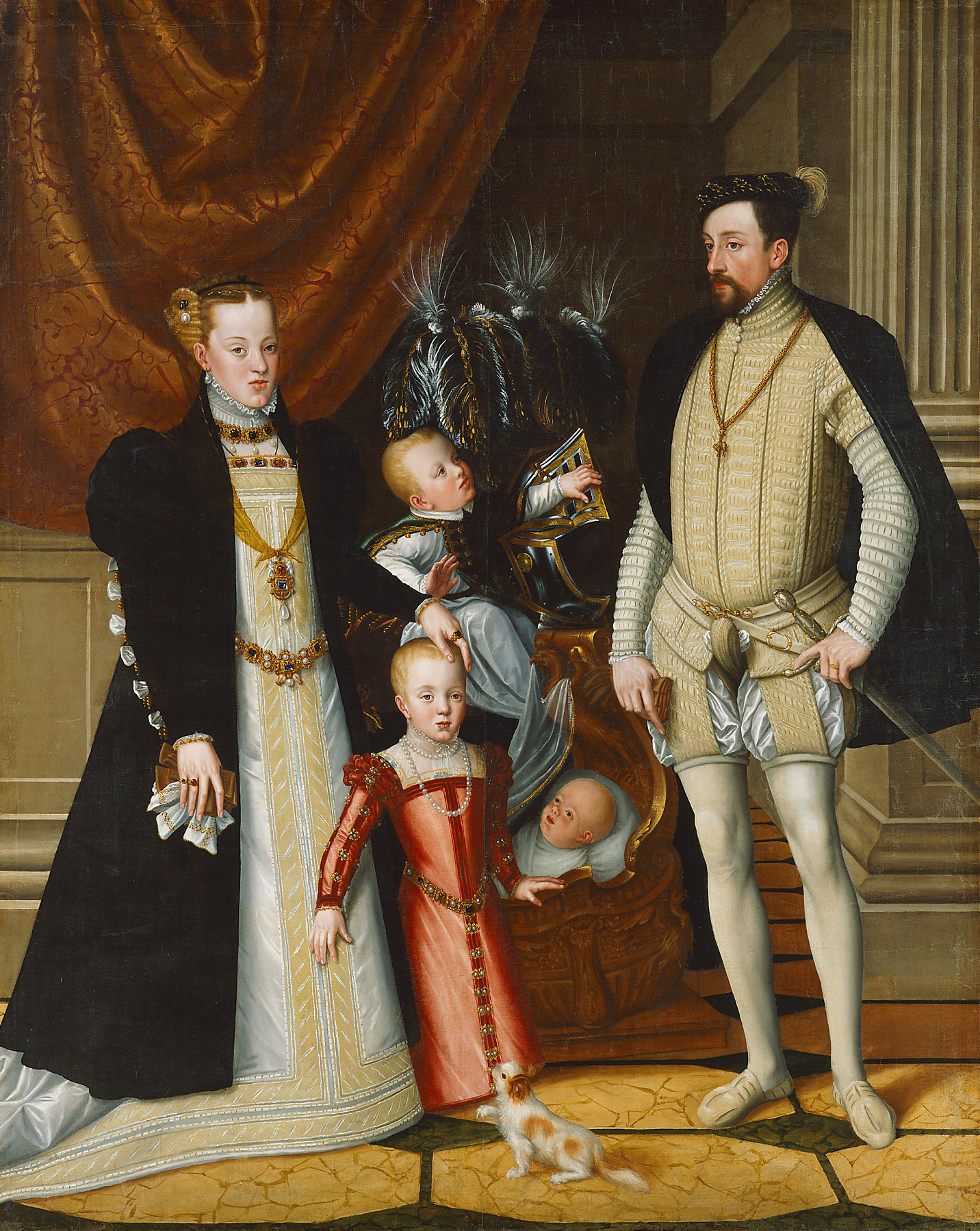
Maximilian II, Holy Roman Emperor and his wife Infanta Maria of Spain with their children

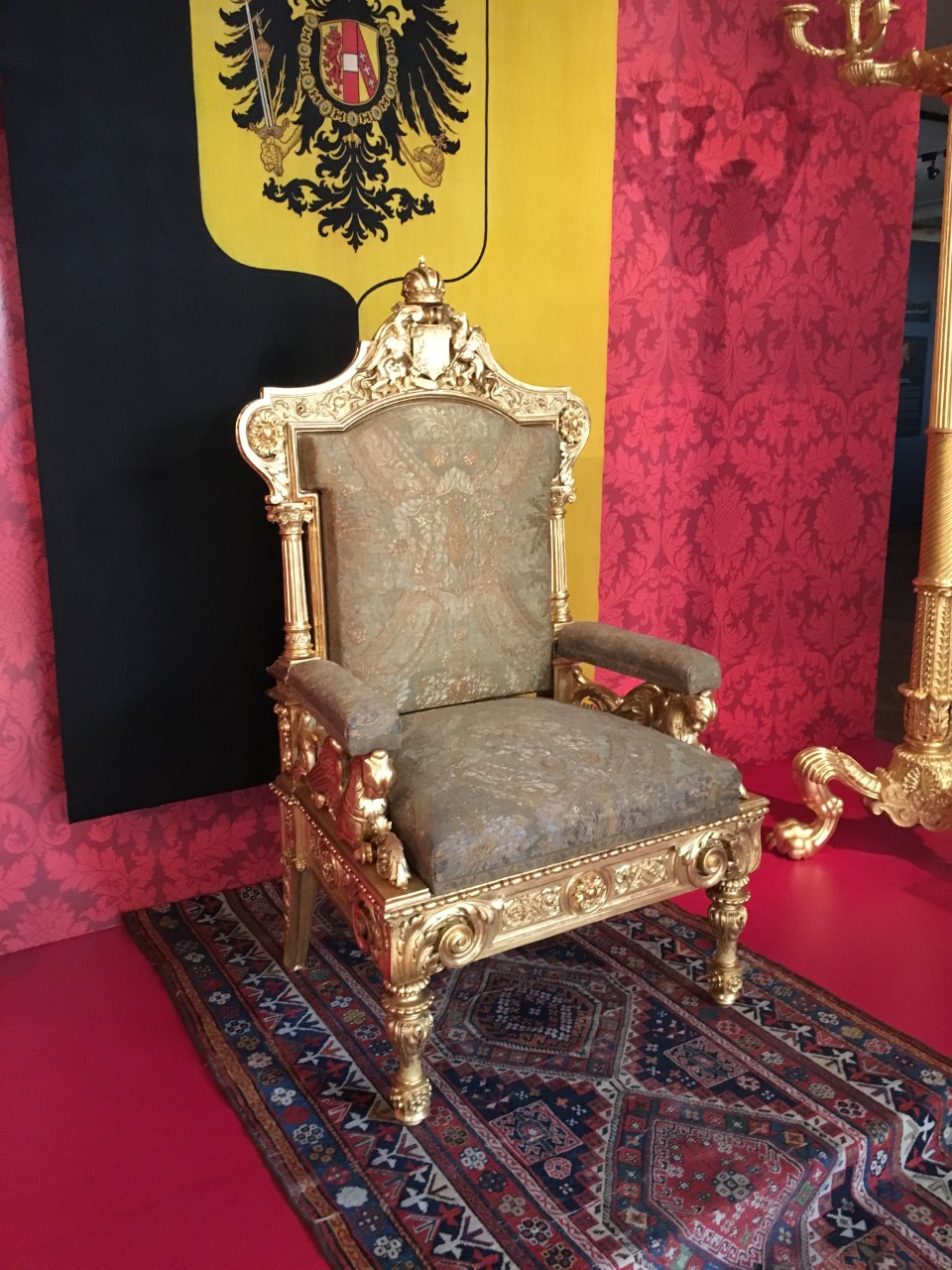
Imperial throne of Austria, made for Emperor Franz Joseph I

- Frederick III (1452–1493)
- Maximilian I (1493–1519)
- Charles V (1519–1556)
- Ferdinand I (1556–1564)
- Maximilian II (1564–1576)
- Rudolf II (1576–1612)
- Matthias (1612–1619)
- Ferdinand II (1619–1637)
- Ferdinand III (1637–1657)
- Leopold I (1657–1705)
- Joseph I (1705–1711)
- Charles VI (1711–1740)
- Maria Theresa (1740–1780)

=== House of Habsburg-Lorraine ===
- Joseph II (1780–1790)
- Leopold II (1790–1792)
- Francis II (1792–1835)
- Ferdinand I (1835–1848)
- Francis Joseph I (1848–1916)
- Charles I (1916–1918)

=== Family tree ===
- Habsburg family tree

== Male-line family tree ==
House of Habsburg

Original line
Albert; Count of Habsburg c. 1188–1239
Rudolf I of Germany c. 1218–1291
Albert I of Germany; 1255–1308	Hartmann; 1263–1281	Rudolf II; Duke of Austria; 1270–1290
Rudolf I of Bohemia; 1281–1307	Frederick the Fair c. 1289–1330	Leopold I Duke of Austria; 1290–1326	Albert II; Duke of Austria; 1298–1358	Henry the Friendly; 1299–1327	Otto; Duke of Austria; 1301–1339	John; Parricida c. 1290–1312/1313
Albertinian line	Leopoldian line
Rudolf IV; Duke of Austria; 1339–1365	Frederick III; 1347–1362	Albert III; Duke of Austria; 1349–1395	Leopold III; Duke of Austria; 1351–1386	Frederick II; Duke of Austria; 1327–1344	Leopold II; Duke of Austria; 1328–1344
Albert IV; Duke of Austria; 1377–1404	William; Duke of Austria c. 1370–1406	Leopold IV; Duke of Austria; 1371–1411	Ernest; Duke of Austria; 1377–1424	Frederick IV; Duke of Austria; 1382–1439
Albert II of Germany; 1397–1439	Frederick III; HRE; 1415–1493	Albert VI; Archduke of Austria; 1418–1463	Sigismund; Archduke of Austria; 1427–1496
Ladislaus the Posthumous; 1440–1457	Maximilian I HRE; 1459–1519
Philip I of Castile; 1478–1506
Spanish / Iberian line	Austrian / HRE line
Charles V HRE; 1500–1558	Ferdinand I HRE; 1503–1564
Philip II of Spain; 1527–1598	Maximilian II; HRE; 1527–1576	Ferdinand II; Archduke of Austria; 1529–1595	Charles II; Archduke of Austria; 1540–1590
Carlos; Prince of Asturias; 1545–1568	Philip III of Spain; 1578–1621	Rudolf II; HRE; 1552–1612	Ernest of Austria; 1553–1595	Matthias; HRE; 1557–1619	Maximilian III; Archduke of Austria; 1558–1618	Albert VII; Archduke of Austria; 1559–1621	Wenceslaus; Archduke of Austria; 1561–1578	Andrew; Margrave of Burgau; 1558–1600	Charles; Margrave of Burgau; 1560–1618	Ferdinand II; HRE; 1578–1637	Maximilian Ernest of Austria; 1583–1616	Leopold V Archduke of Austria; 1586–1632	Charles of Austria; 1590–1624
Philip IV of Spain; 1605–1665	Charles of Austria; 1607–1632	Ferdinand of Austria; 1609–1641	John-Charles of Austria; 1605–1619	Ferdinand III; HRE; 1608–1657	Leopold Wilhelm of Austria; 1614–1662	Ferdinand Charles; Archduke of Austria; 1628–1662	Sigismund Francis; Archduke of Austria; 1630–1665
Balthasar Charles; Prince of Asturias; 1629–1646	Charles II of Spain; 1661–1700	Ferdinand IV; King of the Romans; 1633–1654	Leopold I HRE; 1640–1705	Charles Joseph of Austria; 1649–1664
Joseph I HRE; 1678–1711	Charles VI; HRE; 1685–1740
Lorraine
Maria Theresa; HRE; 1740–1780	Francis I HRE; 1745–1765
Habsburg-Lorraine
Joseph II; HRE; 1765–1790	Leopold II; HRE; 1790–1792
Francis II; HRE; 1792–1806

== See also ==
- Habsburg myth
- Universal monarchy
