= Treaty of Munich (1816) =

1816 treaty between Austria and Bavaria

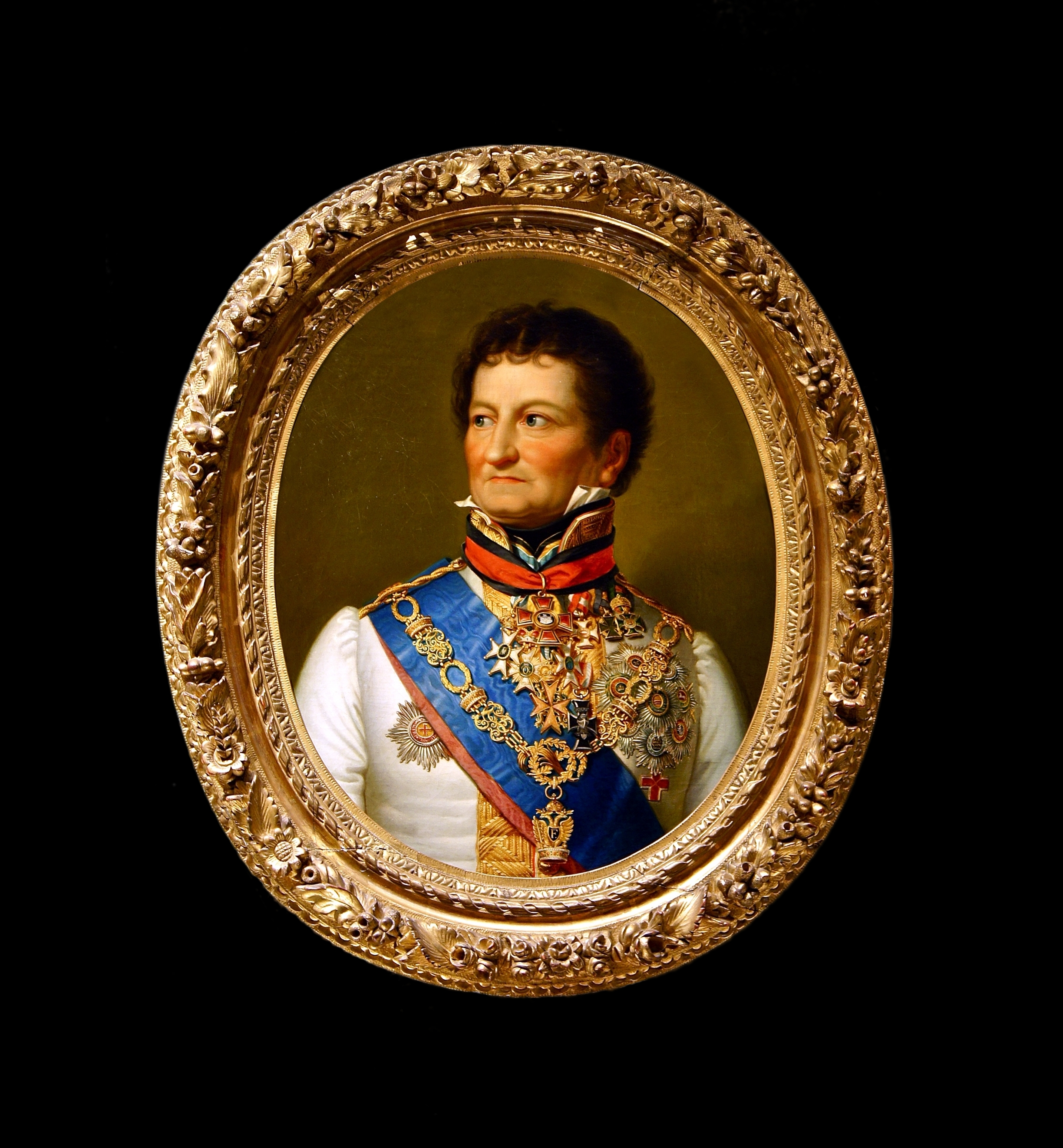
The Austrian negotiator and signatory at Munich, the Baron de Wacquant-Geozelles

The Treaty of Munich (German: Vertrag von München) of 14 April 1816 normalized relations between the Austrian Empire and the Kingdom of Bavaria through several territorial exchanges. It was negotiated and signed at Munich, the capital of Bavaria, by the Baron de Wacquant-Geozelles on behalf of Emperor Francis I and by Counts Maximilian von Montgelas and Aloys von Rechberg on behalf of King Maximilian I.

Bavaria ceded to Austria:

- the parts of the Upper Austrian quarters of Hausruckviertel and Innviertel, that had to be ceded by Bavaria to Austria in the Treaty of Teschen of 1779 and were in turn ceded back to Bavaria in the Treaty of Schönbrunn of 1809
- the bailiwick (Amt) of Vils in the County of Tyrol
- the duchy of Salzburg

Austria ceded to Bavaria:

- on the Left Bank of the Rhine:
  - the former French arrondissements of Kaiserslautern, Speyer and Zweibrücken, except the cantons of Worms and Pfeddersheim, in the former département of Mont-Tonnerre
  - the cantons of Bergzabern, Landau and Langenkandel in the département of Bas-Rhin, as well as that part of the département on the left bank of the Lauter, ceded to Austria by France by the Treaty of Paris on 20 November 1815
- on the Right Bank of the Rhine:
  - the bailiwick of Hammelburg, the greater part of that of Weyhers and a smaller part of that of Bieberstein
  - the bailiwick of Redwitz

Austria also promised to use its good offices to help Bavaria obtain:

- the bailiwicks of Alzenau, Amorbach, Heubach and Miltenberg from the Grand Duchy of Hesse
- a part of the bailiwick of Wertheim from the Grand Duchy of Baden

== Sources ==
- Traité conclu à Munich le 14 avril 1816: entre Sa Majesté l'Empéreur d'Autriche, et Sa Majesté le Roi de Bavière pour fixer les limites et les rapports de leur états respectifs
