= Ferdinand III =

Ferdinand III may refer to:

- Ferdinand III of Castile (died 1252), the Saint (1199–1252, king from 1217)
- Ferdinand III of Naples, the Catholic (1452–1516, king from 1504) (Ferdinand V of Castile and Ferdinand II of Aragon and of Sicily), husband of Isabella of Castile
- Ferdinand III, Holy Roman Emperor (1608–1657, emperor from 1637)
- Ferdinand III of Sicily (1751–1825, king 1759–1816), (Ferdinand IV of Naples 1759–1799; 1799–1806; 1815–1816 and Ferdinand I of the Two Sicilies 1816–1825)
- Ferdinand III, Grand Duke of Tuscany (1769–1824, grand-duke 1791–1799 and 1814–1824)
- Ferdinand III of Navarre (1784–1833), (Ferdinand VII of Castille)
