= Battle of Pfeddersheim =

1525 battle in Europe

- Part of German Peasants' War
Date	23/24 June 1525
Location	near Pfeddersheim
Result	victory to Prince Louis' troops

Belligerents
Armed peasant bands	Troops under Prince Louis

Commanders and leaders
Unknown	Elector Louis V

Strength
Troop strengths were roughly equal	

The Battle of Pfeddersheim (German: Schlacht bei Pfeddersheim) was a battle during the German Peasants' War that took place in June 1525 near Pfeddersheim. The peasants of the Palatinate region had previously joined the uprising in southwest Germany against high taxes and attacked, plundered, and devastated the estates of the nobility and the monasteries.

== Causes ==
The Battle of Pfeddersheim was part of the Palatine Peasants' War of 1525. The unrest amongst the peasants and townsfolk in and around Worms began before 29 April 1525 and reached its zenith in May that year. They demanded that the town authorities comply with 13 articles and make concessions within four days.

These articles were related to three areas: first, in the religious sphere, they demanded a clear and unbiased preaching of the Gospel and the free election of priests and preachers by members of the community. Second, in the economic sphere and where applicable, they demanded that interest, pensions and rent paid to the clergy should cease when they reached three times the principal sum. The peasants also demanded permission to hunt, fish and cut timber from forests and common land.

The articles, which affected constitutional law, ended by demanding that the treaty of 1519, known as the Rachtung, be repealed and the records destroyed. All privileges of the clergy, even if they were granted by emperors, kings, and popes should be declared void. The clergy should now be charged and pay for pasture, guarding (Wacht), direct taxes (Schatzung) excise tax (Ungeld) and Kaufhausgeld.

Although there was no direct contact between the citizens and peasants in April and May 1525, because the Council had forbidden that, both sides were always informed about each other.

In Pfeddersheim the clergy, nobility, and monastery owned over a third of the arable land. However, there appears to be no particular, local reason for the sudden unrest amongst the Pfeddersheim townsfolk. Rather, they seem to have heard about the situation further afield and followed suit. They had no doubt heard of events in southwest Germany, felt a wave of protest growing and were inclined to join the uprising to improve their social and economic situation. Consequently, it was fairly easy for rebellious peasants to take possession of Pfeddersheim. Meanwhile, after the conquest of Würzburg, Elector Louis V of the Palatinate returned with his army as quickly as possible to his territory to bring an end to the uprising there.

== Battle ==
=== Troops and weaponry ===
==== Peasants ====
The peasants were armed with lances, morning stars, and farm implements. In addition, some peasant mobs had captured firearms. However, in comparison with the prince's troops they were poorly equipped because most of the weapons they had were those they had captured or stolen. The prince's troops, of course, were able to be issued with weapons from the armouries.

==== Elector Louis' troops ====
The Elector's Landsknechte who, unlike the peasants, had received military training, were also better armed. Their weapons included several kartouwes (siege guns), scharfmetzes, notschlangen, culverins, demi-culverins, and falconets. Elector Louis also had several so-called Fähnchens, cavalry squadrons each comprising about 150 troopers.

=== Course of the battle ===
==== First phase ====
After the Elector's troops had marched on Pfeddersheim, Marschall von Habern and Schenk Eberhard von Erbach had the artillery and infantry deploy on an eminence to the north only a few metres from the town. Shortly thereafter his artillery began to open fire on the town's defences. The rebels replied with their artillery, though the exchange of fire was indecisive.

==== Second phase ====
When the Palatine army failed to overcome the rebels with their artillery, they began to establish observation points in order to ascertain what the peasants might do next. In addition, cannon, which had hitherto played a secondary role in the battle, were set up relatively close to the town. Small mounted Fähnleins were also formed and posted on some heights southwest of Pfeddersheim in order to observe the peasants.

==== Third phase ====
After troops had been deployed both to the north and the southwest and another position established to the west, the encirclement of Pfeddersheim was almost complete. The east was not occupied because, in the view of the commander, it was unnecessary because there was no gate through which the townsfolk to escape. Nonetheless a final disposition outside the circumvallation was made, in which the cook, the food supply wagon, and, later, Elector Louis, were based. The Knechte (infantry) established themselves between this new position and the River Pfrimm. So the various arms of service were all kept separate and not mixed. No fighting took place during this phase.

==== Fourth phase ====
Shortly after the last position had been occupied, a small force of peasants poured out of the west gate of the town. The besiegers suspected that they wanted to advance to the cover of the Georgenberg hill and also that they wanted to attack the horsemen to the south and drive them away. However, neither of these assumptions came to anything because, suddenly, another 7,000 men stormed out of the gate and advanced over the western approaches presumably thinking they could easily defeat the cavalry deployed there. They could not defeat the Prince's cavalry, however, because the latter exceeded the strength and fighting power of the peasants, so they fell back to the hill of Wingartberg, from where they fired on the main body of the cavalry with their guns. Because the Prince's troops did not know where the peasants had gone to when they left the hill, they then waited to see what would happen next. When the peasant bands then stormed the main body of the Prince's army pouring down the southern slopes of the hill, Marshal von Habern went to the aid of the field captain (Feldhauptmann) at his request and placed his troops behind the main body. The artillery grouped around them then immediately fired on the attackers.

As the peasant force now looked overmatched, they tried to flee to the town. The royal troops sought to prevent their escape behind the town walls and pursued with their squadrons and mounted troops, with the result many farmers failed to reach the safety of the town. A total of 4,000 peasants were cut off and then either stabbed or strangled on the spot. The remaining peasants who were still in front of the town gate, tried to enter the town. Some peasants even tried to escape to Worms. This incident decimated the ranks of the peasants.

As it was already night, when the last peasants had either been killed or escaped into the town, three Fähnleins, 1,500 Knechte, and 1,000 horsemen, were deployed around the town for the rest of the night. The next morning, guns were situated near the town and began to open fire. After three hours and 262 shells had been fired, the peasants capitulated and the Prince's army had won the battle.

== After the battle ==
=== Reasons for the peasants' defeat ===
Although both armies were, numerically, roughly the same size, the peasants were defeated primarily for two reasons: first, although the peasants were not poorly armed, because they not only had pitchforks, scythes, and flails, but also pikes, guns, and cannons, they were still powerless against the cavalry since they had no cavalry - a decisive disadvantage. Second, the peasants did not have a military leader who could have coordinated the troops and their direction, objectives, and firepower. There were ringleaders amongst the peasants, but they had no influence beyond the boundaries of their home area. At that time, the peasants did not recognize that they would have no chance of success against the Prince without a united approach.

=== Consequences for the peasants ===
On 25 June, all peasants who were not Palatinate subjects had to leave the town unarmed. Approximately 3,000 obeyed the command. Although they had been warned not to attempt to escape, many farmers took the first opportunity to escape for fear of punishment. The escape attempt failed, however, and the soldiers initiated a bloodbath that cost the lives of 800 people. Thirty ringleaders were immediately beheaded; the other peasants were released under strict conditions to their homes.

After the massacre, the troops occupied the town. The remaining peasants had to gather on the cemetery. 180 ringleaders were detained in the shared church at Pfeddersheim. The Pfeddersheim townsfolk had to guard them. For each peasant who escaped, they were warned that a citizen had to lose his life. The inhabitants had to hand over all those they had hidden by the next morning. 24 leaders were executed. All the other peasants were allowed to go free for a fee.

But the Pfeddersheim townsfolk were severely punished. Four of their leaders were beheaded. Heavy penalties were imposed on the town: they had to pay high levels of duty, hand over all their weapons, and give up their letters of freedom.

== Today ==
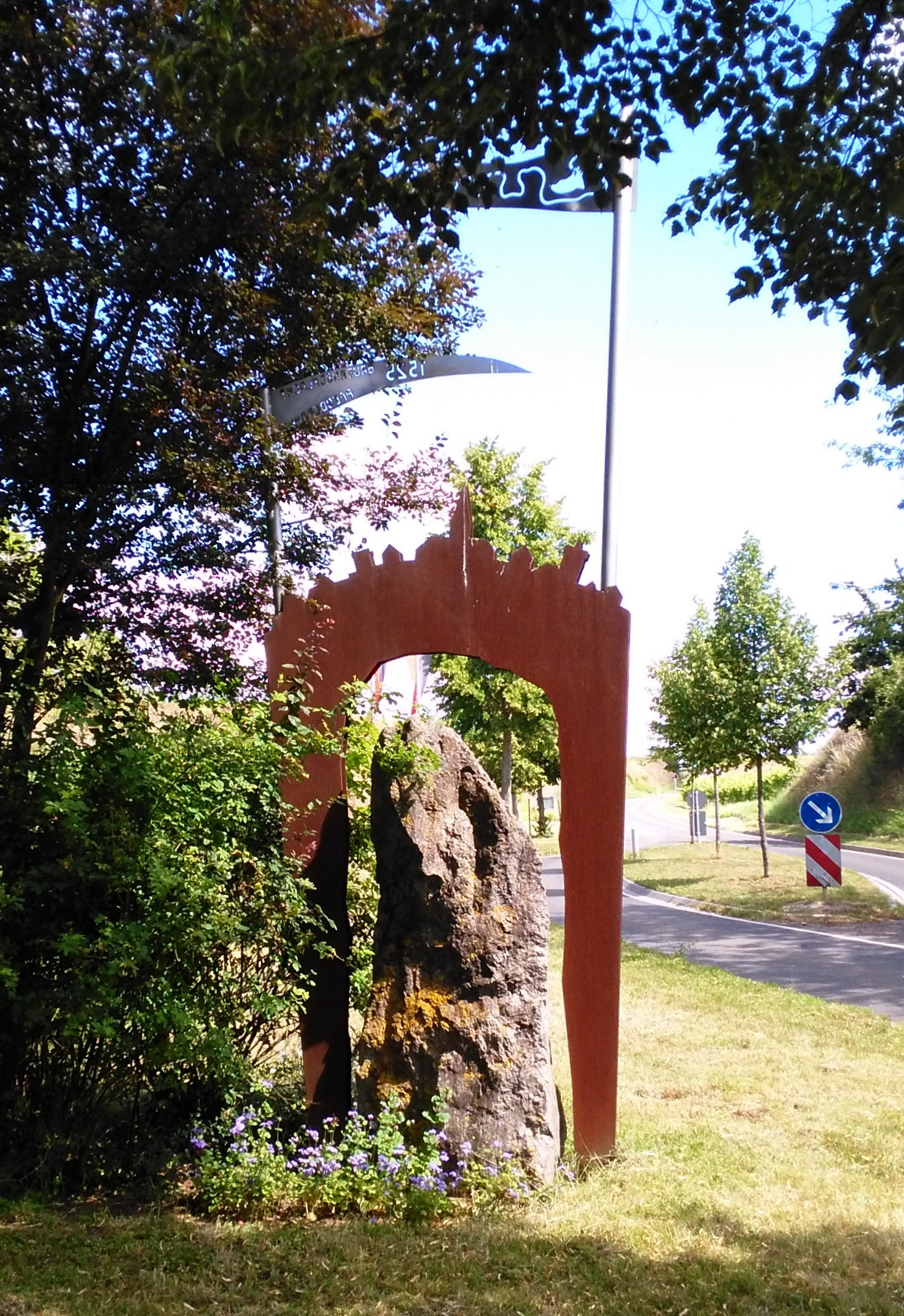
memorial

Even today a road that runs northwards towards Mörstadt - Georg Scheu Straße - is known locally as Bluthohl ("blood hollow"). The name comes from the accounts that the battle had raged on the nearby fields that were at a higher level and that the blood of the fallen ran down this road into the town.

== Literature ==
- Manfred Bensing, Siegfried Hoyer: Der deutsche Bauernkrieg 1524-1526. 4. Auflage. Militärverlag der DDR, Berlin, 1982, (Kleine Militärgeschichte. Kriege).
