= Arrondissement de Spire =

Spire Speyer
- Arrondissement
- Country: French Empire
- Department: Mont-Tonnerre
- Established: February 17, 1800
- Disbanded: 1814

The Arrondissement de Spire (German: Arrondissement Speyer) was a former French administrative subdivision of the Department of Mont-Tonnerre that was created on February 17, 1800 from territory captured from the Holy Roman Empire during the War of the First Coalition. It was abolished on April 11, 1814 and the territory was ceded to Austria and Bavaria.

It was located on what is now German territory in Rhineland-Palatinate. It contained the cantons of Dürkheim, Edenkoben, Frankenthal, Germersheim, Grünstadt, Mutterstadt, Neustadt, Pfeddersheim, Speyer and Worms.
