= Palatine Peasants' War =

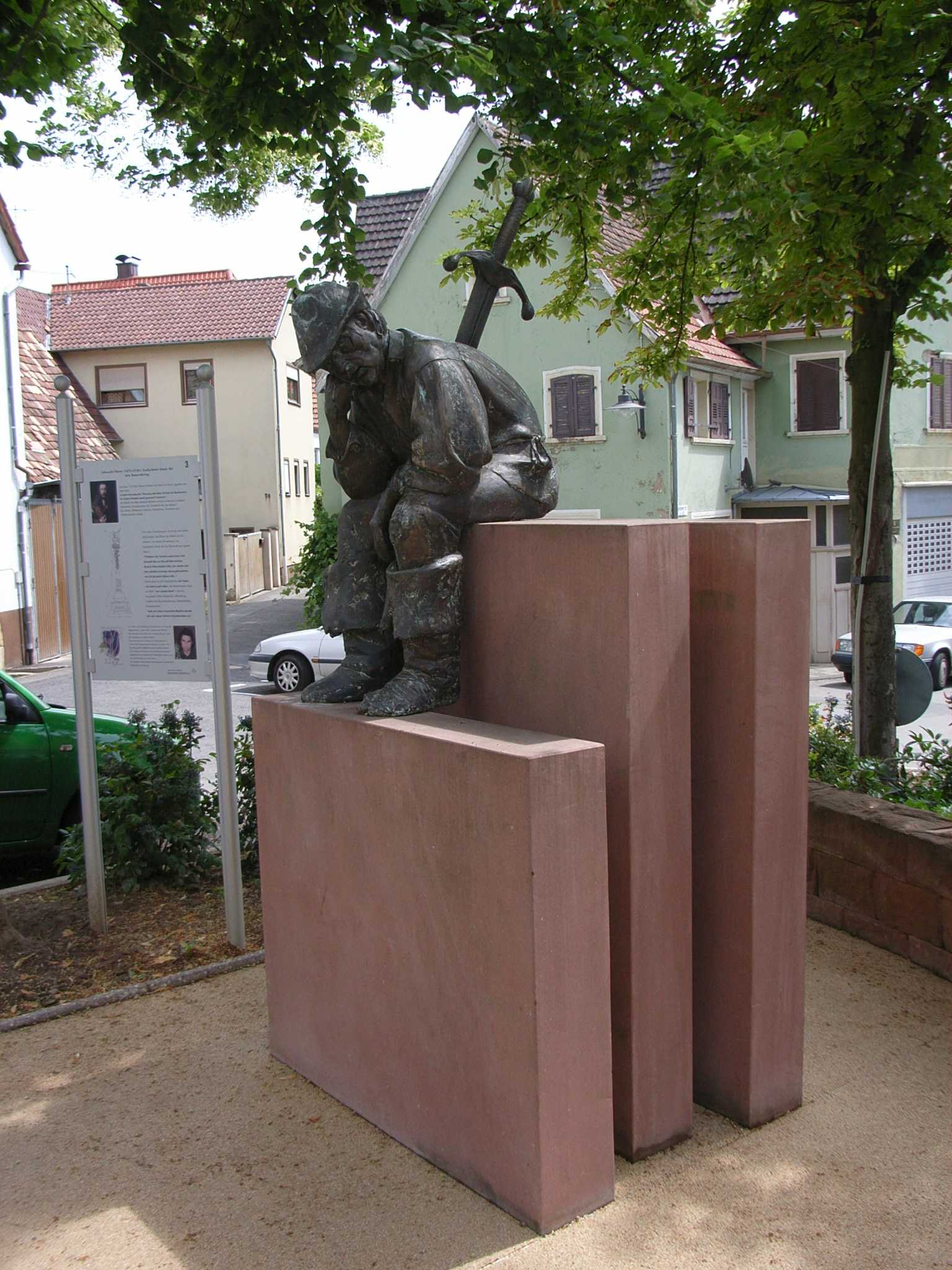
Memorial to the fallen peasants in Nußdorf

The Palatine Peasants' War (German: pfälzische Bauernkrieg) was part of the general German Peasants' War on the Middle and Upper Rhine. The uprising in the Palatine Electorate and its surrounding area took place in April to June 1525.

The start of the German Peasants' War in West Rhenish Palatinate was marked by the gathering of a band of peasants, a so-called Haufe, at Nußdorf near Landau on 23 April 1525. The Palatine peasant mobs plundered several surrounding monasteries (including the Knights Hospitaller commandry of Heimbach near Zeiskam as well as Hördt, where the provost was killed) and castles, before they took Neustadt on 6 May without a fight. The peasants' programme was based on the Twelve Articles, which were drawn up at Memmingen and of which 25,000 copies were printed. A second Haufe gathered near Bockenheim. As a result, the Palatine prince-elector, Louis V felt forced into negotiations with the Geilweiler and Bockenheim groups; these began on 10 May in Forst. The complaints were to be handled by a Landtag. The Elector finally resorted to military force against the peasants on 23 May with the support of troops from the Archbishop of Trier, after other princes had defeated the uprisings in Württemberg and in the Alsace. The Palatine peasants mobs were crushingly defeated at the Battle of Pfeddersheim on 23/24 June. Eight thousand peasants were reported to have been killed in the battle.

== Literature ==
- Miller, Douglas (2003). Armies of the German Peasants' War 1524-26, Oxford: Osprey, ISBN 1-84176-507-4.
- Buzello, Horst et al. (ed.): Der deutsche Bauernkrieg. Schöningh, Paderborn etc., 1984, ISBN 3-506-99350-X, pp. 90ff. (Uni-Taschenbücher - Geschichte 1275)
