= Mont-Tonnerre =

French department (1797–1814)

Coordinates: 50°N 8.26667°E

Department of Mont-Tonnerre Département du Mont-Tonnerre (French)
- Department of the French First Republic
- 1797–1814
- Location of Mont-Tonnerre in France (1812)
- Capital: Mainz
- History
  - Established: 1797
  - Disestablished: 1814
Preceded by
Electorate of Mainz
Prince-Bishopric of Speyer
Prince-Bishopric of Worms
Nassau-Weilburg
Landgraviate of Hesse-Darmstadt
Electoral Palatinate
Succeeded by
Kingdom of Bavaria
Grand Duchy of Hesse
- Today part of: Germany

Mont-Tonnerre (French: [mɔ̃.tɔ.nɛʁ]) was a department of the First French Republic and later the First French Empire in present-day Germany. It was named after the highest point in the Palatinate, the Donnersberg ("Thunder Mountain", possibly referring to Donar, god of thunder). It was the southernmost of four departments formed in 1797 when the west bank of the Rhine was annexed by France. Prior to the French occupation, its territory was divided between the Archbishopric of Mainz, the Bishopric of Speyer, the Bishopric of Worms, Nassau-Weilburg, Hesse-Darmstadt, the Electorate of the Palatinate and the imperial cities of Worms and Speyer. After Napoleon was defeated in 1814, the department was divided between the Kingdom of Bavaria (Palatinate) and the Grand Duchy of Hesse (around Mainz).

Its territory is now part of the German states of Rhineland-Palatinate and Saarland. Its capital was Mainz (French: Mayence).

== Administration ==
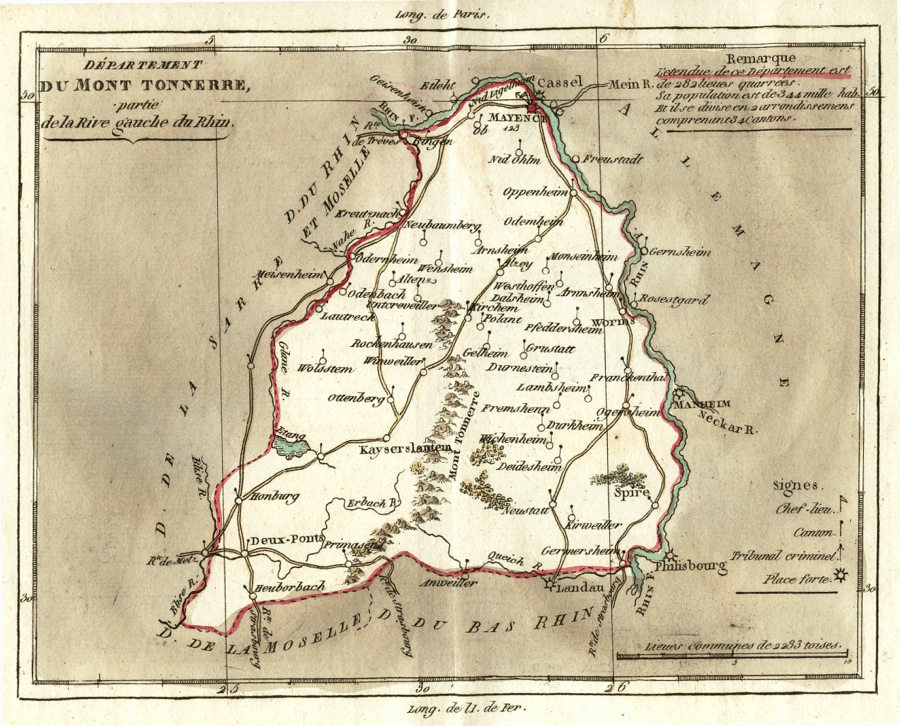
Map of the former département du Mont-Tonnerre

The department was subdivided into the following arrondissements and cantons (situation in 1812):

- Mainz, cantons: Alzey, Bingen, Bechtheim, Kirchheimbolanden, Mainz (2 cantons), Nieder-Olm, Ober-Ingelheim, Oppenheim, Wöllstein and Wörrstadt.
- Kaiserslautern (French: Kayserslautern), cantons: Göllheim, Kaiserslautern, Lauterecken, Obermoschel, Otterberg, Rockenhausen, Winnweiler and Wolfstein.
- Speyer (French: Spire), cantons: Dürkheim, Edenkoben, Frankenthal, Germersheim, Grünstadt, Mutterstadt, Neustadt, Pfeddersheim, Speyer and Worms.
- Zweibrücken (French: Deux-Ponts), cantons: Annweiler, Homburg, Landstuhl, Medelsheim, Neuhornbach, Pirmasens, Waldfischbach and Zweibrücken.

Its population in 1812 was 342,316.
