= Electorate of Salzburg =

State of the Holy Roman Empire (1803–1805)

Electorate of Salzburg Kurfürstentum Salzburg (German)
- 1803–1805
- Flag Coat of arms

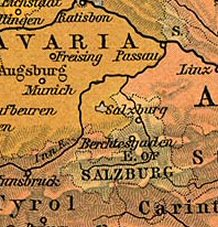
- Salzburg between the Bavarian and Habsburg lands
- Capital: Salzburg
- Government: Electorate
- Elector
  - 1803–1805: Ferdinand III
- Historical era: Napoleonic Wars
  - Archbishopric secularized: 11 February 1803
  - Raised to an electorate: 27 April 1803
  - Transferred to Austria: 26 December 1805
- Currency: Salzburg Thaler
Preceded by	Succeeded by
Prince-Archbishopric of Salzburg	Duchy of Salzburg

The Electorate of Salzburg ( German: Kurfürstentum Salzburg or Kursalzburg) was an electoral principality of the Holy Roman Empire that existed from 1803 to 1805. It was established as the secular successor state to the Prince-Archbishopric of Salzburg following the German mediatisation of 1803 and was ruled by Ferdinand III, Grand Duke of Tuscany.

The electorate was created when the Prince-Archbishopric of Salzburg was secularized and its territory was reorganized as a secular principality within the Holy Roman Empire. Ferdinand III received the electoral title and ruled Salzburg until the territory was transferred to the Austrian Empire in 1805 following the Peace of Pressburg. The state was subsequently reorganized as the Duchy of Salzburg.

== History ==
In 1800 the territory of the Prince-Archbishopric had been occupied by French forces during the War of the Second Coalition, whereby Prince-Archbishop Count Hieronymus von Colloredo fled to Vienna. Augmented by the Berchtesgaden Provostry and parts of the former prince-bishoprics of Eichstätt and Passau, his lands were reorganized as the Electorate of Salzburg, created for Archduke Ferdinand of Habsburg-Lorraine, younger brother of Emperor Francis II.

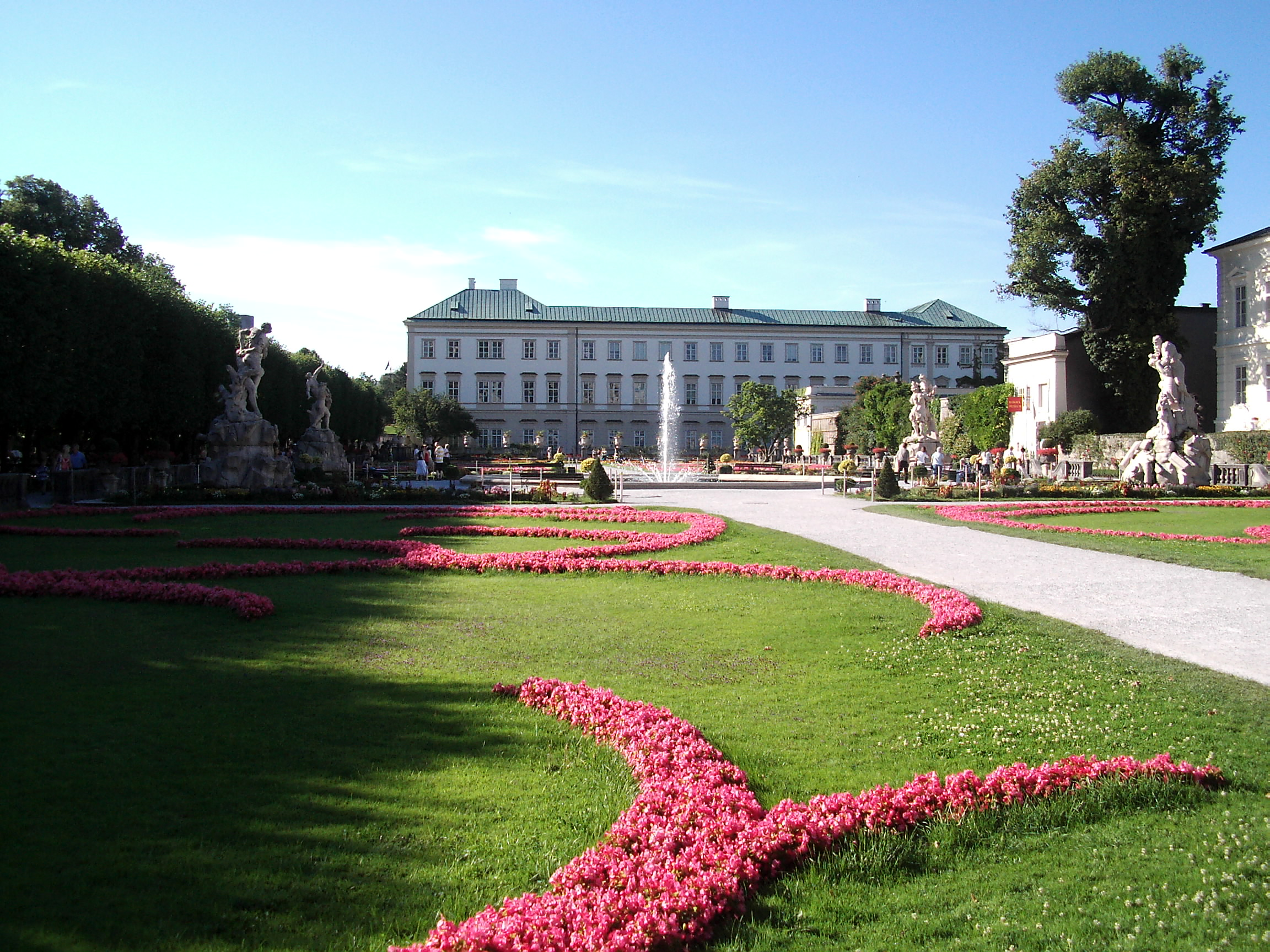
Ferdinand's residence Mirabell Palace

Ferdinand had held the Grand Duchy of Tuscany until 1801, when Emperor Francis had to cede the rule over Tuscany to France and Louis of Bourbon-Parma according to the Treaty of Lunéville. The grand duke, on good terms with Napoleon, reached his compensation with the former archbishopric in December 1802. The secularisation was accomplished, when Prince-Archbishop Colloredo in his Vienna exile formally resigned in favour of Ferdinand on 11 February 1803. Two weeks later, the episcopal territory was secularized as part of the German Mediatisation (Reichsdeputationshauptschluss).

Ferdinand turned out to be a capable ruler. He established the Faculty of Medicine at the Salzburg University and installed the distinguished pedagogue Franz Michael Vierthaler to introduce an education reform. He also ordered the improvement of mountain pass roads to Bad Gastein, Sankt Johann im Pongau and Radstadt, while his economic reforms roused opposition by the Salzburg guilds. When in October 1805 French troops again moved in during the War of the Third Coalition, Ferdinand, like his predecessor Archbishop Colloredo, had to leave his residence for his brother's court in Vienna.

Upon the crushing Austrian defeat in the Battle of Austerlitz, the Salzburg electorate was dissolved by the Peace of Pressburg signed on 26 December 1805. The lands of the former archbishopric with Berchtesgaden passed to the Austrian Empire, while the Eichstätt and Passau territories were annexed by the Kingdom of Bavaria. Ferdinand was again compensated, this time with the newly established Electorate of Würzburg.

With the final dissolution of the Holy Roman Empire in 1806, the electorate was re-established as the Austrian Duchy of Salzburg and Francis added "Duke of Salzburg" to his title as Emperor of Austria. However, Salzburg remained an object of interests and negotiations during the Napoleonic Wars. After the War of the Fifth Coalition it passed to Bavaria according to the 1809 Treaty of Schönbrunn, incorporated into the Salzach District together with Tyrolean Kitzbühel, Traunstein and Ried im Innkreis in 1810.

The Salzburg region was finally divided between Austria and Bavaria in the 1814 Peace of Paris. From 1816 the major part east of the Salzach river was subsequently administered from Linz within Upper Austria, until the Salzburg duchy was re-established in 1850.
