= Ferdinand III of Tuscany =

Grand Duke of Tuscany (1790–1801; 1814–1824)

Ferdinand III
- Elector of Salzburg (1803–1805); Elector of Würzburg (1805–1806); Grand Duke of Würzburg (1806–1814)
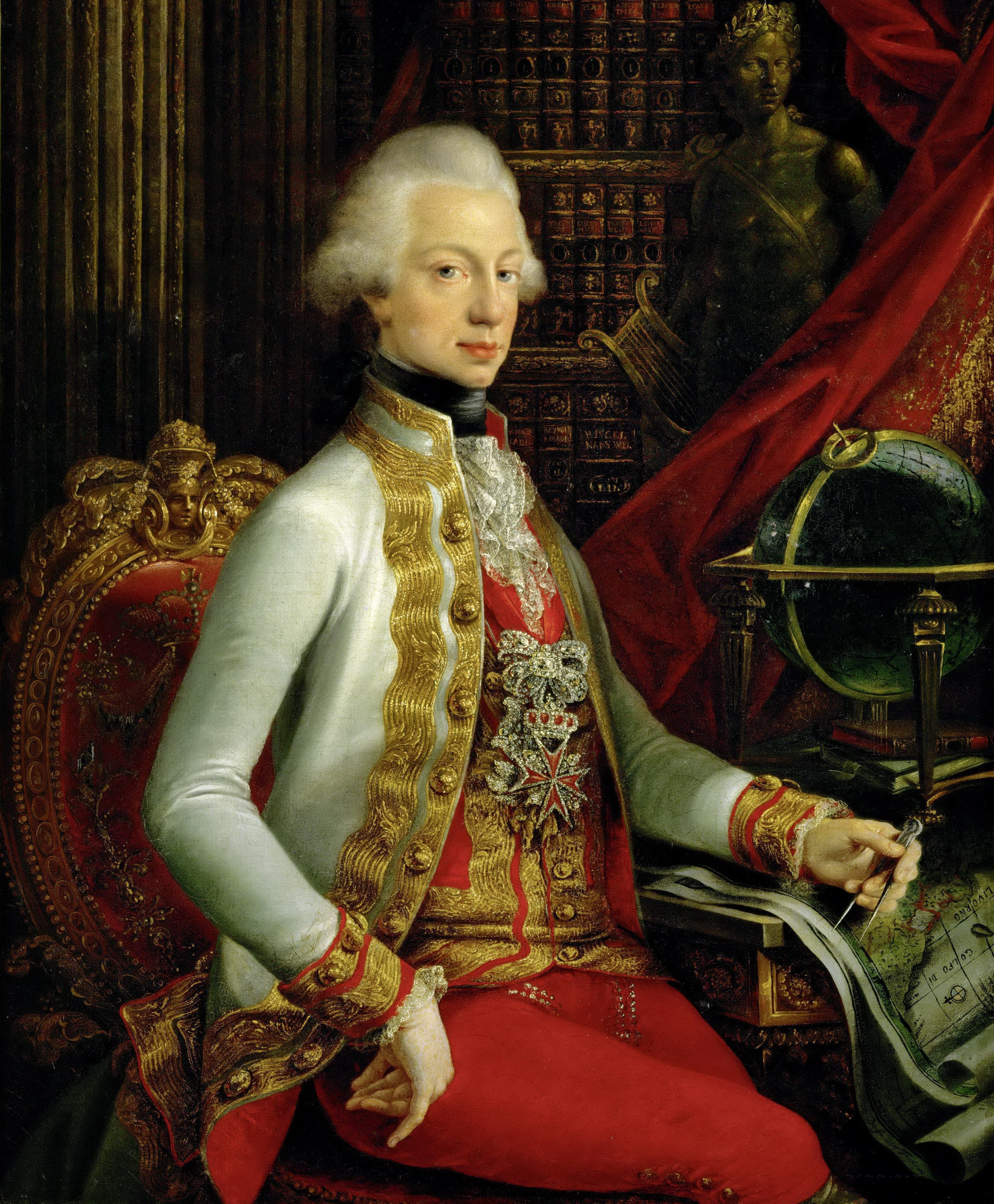
- Portrait, 1797

Grand Duke of Tuscany
- Reign: 22 July 1790 – 3 August 1801
- Predecessor: Leopold I
- Successor: Louis I (as King of Etruria)
- Reign: 27 April 1814 – 18 June 1824
- Predecessor: Elisa Bonaparte
- Successor: Leopold II

Duke of Salzburg
- Reign: 27 April 1803 – 26 December 1805

(Grand) Duke of Würzburg
- Reign: 26 December 1805 – 3 June 1814
- Born: 6 May 1769; Florence, Grand Duchy of Tuscany
- Died: 18 June 1824 (aged 55); Florence, Grand Duchy of Tuscany
- Spouse: Princess Luisa of Naples and Sicily (m. 1790; died 1802) Princess Maria Ferdinanda of Saxony (m. 1821)
- Issue Detail: Leopold II of Tuscany; Archduchess Maria Luisa; Maria Theresa, Queen of Sardinia
Names
- Ferdinando Giuseppe Giovanni Battista
- House: Habsburg-Lorraine
- Father: Leopold II, Holy Roman Emperor
- Mother: Maria Luisa of Spain
- Religion: Roman Catholicism

Ferdinand III (Note: (Italian: Ferdinando Giuseppe Giovanni Battista; English: Ferdinand Joseph John Baptist.) (6 May 1769 – 18 June 1824) was Grand Duke of Tuscany from 1790 to 1801 and, after a period of disenfranchisement, again from 1814 to 1824. He was also the Prince-elector and Grand Duke of Salzburg (1803–1805) and Duke and Elector (to 1806, Grand Duke from 1806) of Würzburg (1805–1814).

== Biography ==
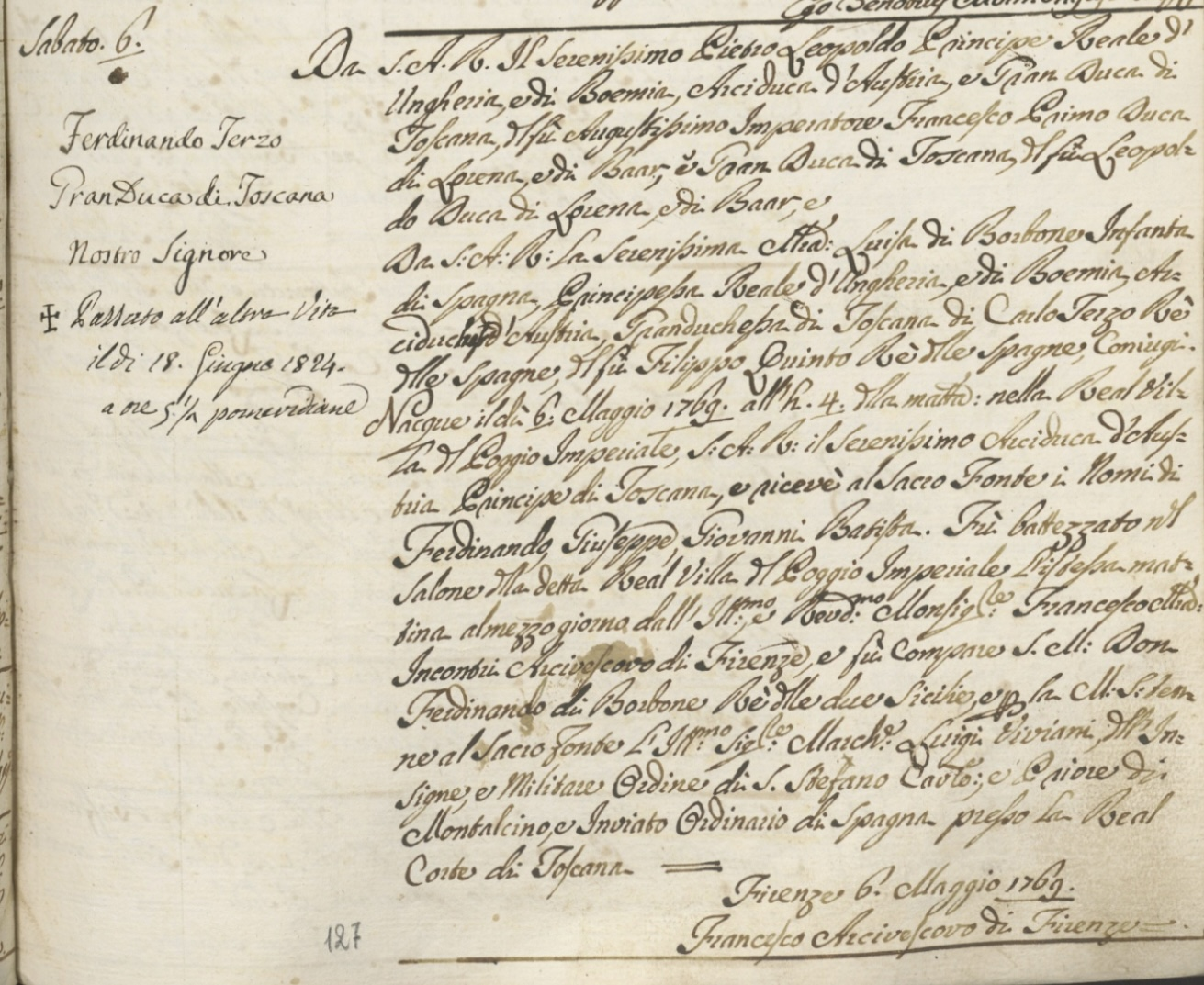
Baptismal certificate Ferdinand III, Grand Duke of Tuscany.

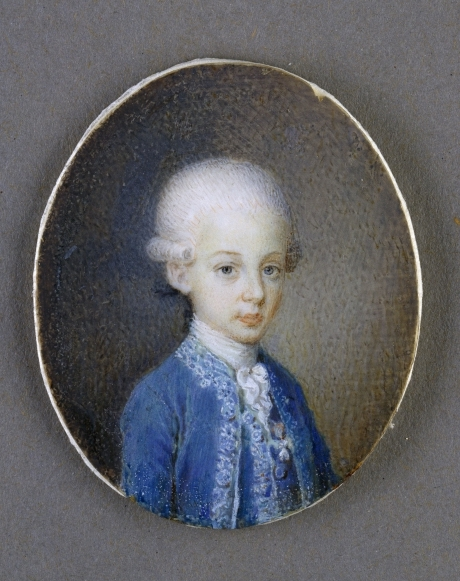
Ferdinand as a young boy.

Ferdinand was born in Florence, Tuscany, into the House of Habsburg-Lorraine on 6 May 1769. He was the second son of Leopold, then Grand-Duke of Tuscany, and Infanta Maria Luisa of Spain. As the Grand Duchy was a secundogeniture, when his father was elected Emperor of the Holy Roman Empire, Ferdinand succeeded him as Grand Duke of Tuscany, officially taking the office on 22 July 1790.

In 1792, during the French Revolution, Ferdinand became the first monarch to recognize the new French First Republic formally, and he attempted to work peacefully with it. As the French Revolutionary Wars commenced, however, the rulers of Britain and Russia persuaded him to join their side in the War of the First Coalition. Ferdinand provided his allies with passive support but no enthusiasm, and after he witnessed a year of resounding victories by the French, he became the first member of the coalition to give up. In a proclamation dated 1 March 1795, he abandoned the alliance and declared Tuscany's neutrality in the war.

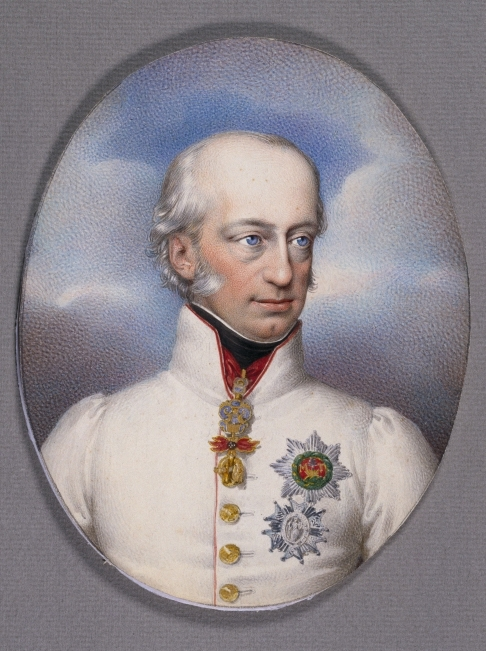
Portrait of an aging Ferdinand.

His normalization of relations with France helped stabilize his rule for several years, but by 1799, he was compelled to flee to Vienna for protection when republicans established a new provisional government in Florence. He was forced to renounce his throne by the Treaty of Aranjuez (1801): Napoleon brushed him aside to make way for the Kingdom of Etruria, created as compensation for the Bourbon Dukes of Parma, dispossessed by the Peace of Lunéville in that same year.

Ferdinand was compensated with the Electorate of Salzburg, the secularized former territory of the Prince-Archbishopric of Salzburg. He was also made a Prince-elector of the Holy Roman Empire (a role which expired with the empire's dissolution in 1806), receiving the title and land on 26 December 1802.

On 25 December 1805, Ferdinand had to give up Salzburg as well, which by the Treaty of Pressburg was annexed by his older brother, Emperor Francis II. Ferdinand was then made duke of Würzburg, a new state created for him from the old Prince-Bishopric of Würzburg, while remaining an elector. With the dissolution of the Holy Roman Empire in 1806, he took the new title of Grand Duke of Würzburg.

On 30 May 1814, after Napoleon's fall, Ferdinand was restored as grand duke of Tuscany.

Ferdinand died on 18 June 1824 in Florence and was succeeded by his son Leopold.

== Family and children ==
In Naples on 15 August 1790 by proxy and in Vienna on 19 September 1790 in person, Ferdinand married firstly his double first cousin, Princess Luisa of Naples and Sicily (1773–1802), daughter of Ferdinand I of the Two Sicilies and Maria Carolina of Austria.

They had five children:

- Archduchess Carolina Ferdinanda of Austria (2 August 1793 – 5 January 1802) died in childhood.
- Francis Leopold, Grand Prince of Tuscany (15 December 1794 – 18 May 1800) died in childhood.
- Leopold II of Tuscany (3 October 1797 – 29 January 1870)
- Archduchess Maria Luisa of Austria (30 August 1798 – 15 June 1857)
- Archduchess Maria Teresa of Austria (21 March 1801 – 12 January 1855)

Their first two children, Carolina and Francis, died at very young ages (eight and five respectively) but the later three prospered under their father's care. Luisa died when they were all quite young, on 19 September 1802, together with a stillborn son who was unnamed. Two decades later, in Florence on 6 May 1821, Ferdinand married again, this time to the much younger Princess Maria Ferdinanda of Saxony (1796–1865). She was the daughter of Maximilian, Prince of Saxony, and Caroline of Parma; she was also his first cousin once removed, as well as the first cousin once removed of the dead Luisa, and the sister of his daughter-in-law Princess Maria Anna of Saxony. Though Ferdinand was likely hoping to produce another male heir, there were no children born of this second marriage.

== Ancestry ==
Ancestors of Ferdinand III of Tuscany

8. Leopold, Duke of Lorraine
4. Francis I, Holy Roman Emperor
9. Élisabeth Charlotte of Orléans
2. Leopold II, Holy Roman Emperor
10. Charles VI, Holy Roman Emperor
5. Maria Theresa of Austria
11. Elisabeth Christine of Brunswick
1. Ferdinand III, Grand Duke of Tuscany
12. Philip V of Spain
6. Charles III of Spain
13. Elisabeth Farnese
3. Maria Luisa of Spain
14. Augustus III of Poland
7. Maria Amalia of Saxony
15. Maria Josepha of Austria

== Notes ==
Ferdinand III of Tuscany House of Habsburg-Lorraine Cadet branch of the House of Lorraine Born: 6 May 1769 Died: 18 June 1824
Regnal titles
Preceded by Leopold I	Grand Duke of Tuscany; 1790–1801	Succeeded by Louis I, King of Etruria
Preceded by Hieronymus von Colloredo, Archbishop of Salzburg	Prince-Elector and Grand Duke of Salzburg; 1803–1805	Succeeded by Francis II, Holy Roman Emperor
Preceded by part of Bavaria	Grand Duke of Würzburg; 1805–1814	Succeeded by part of Bavaria
Preceded by part of the First French Empire	Grand Duke of Tuscany; 1814–1824	Succeeded by Leopold II
