= Peace of Pressburg (1805) =

1805 peace treaty ending the War of the Third Coalition

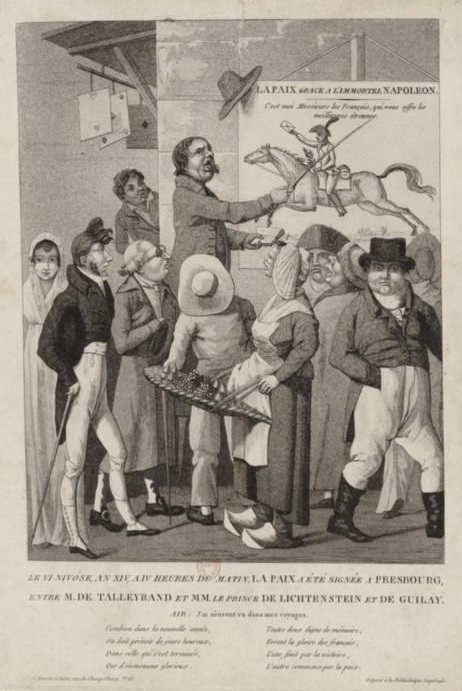
Contemporary print advertising the Peace of Pressburg

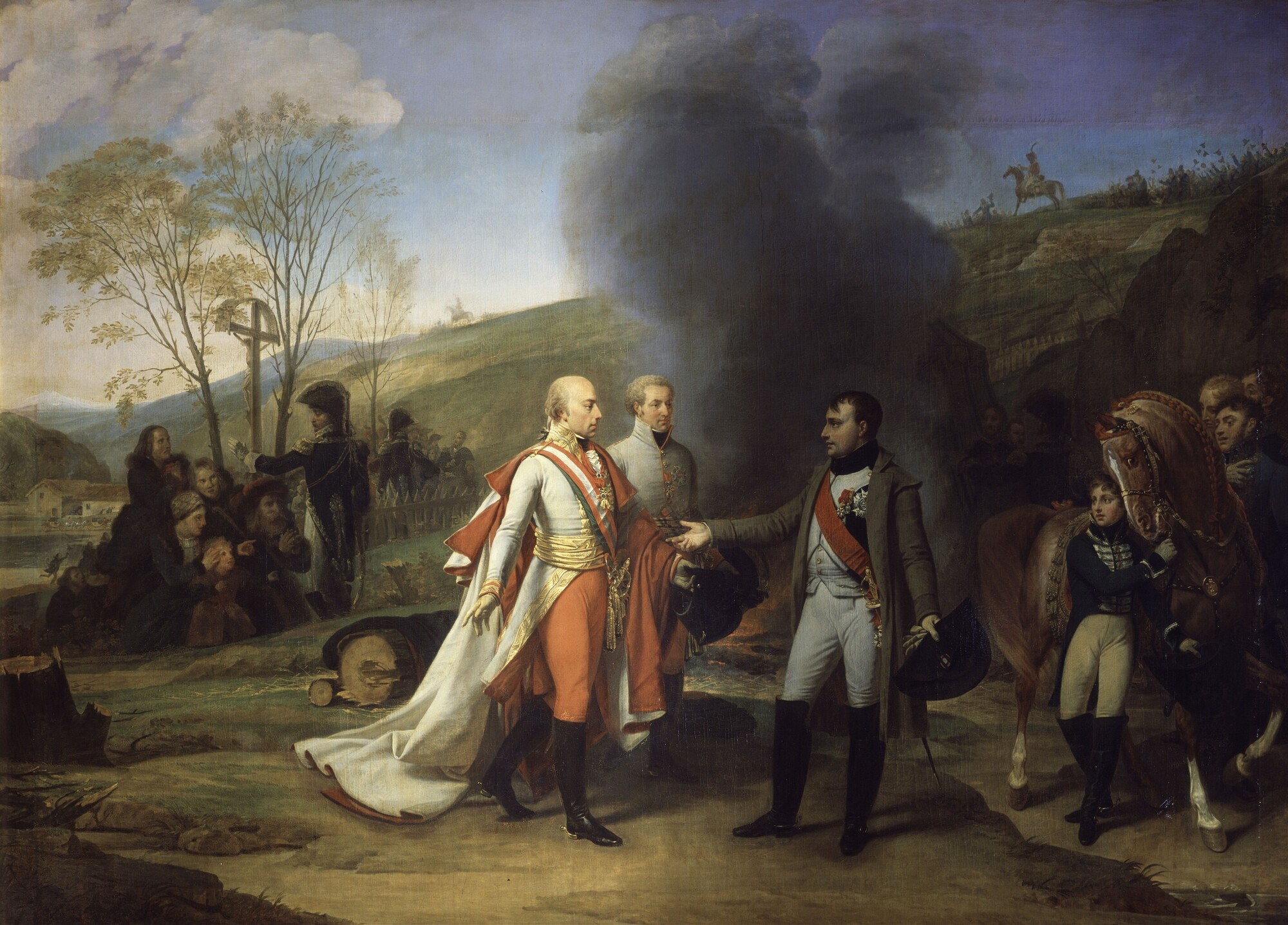
Interview Between Napoleon and Francis II after the Battle of Austerlitz by Antoine-Jean Gros, 1812. The two Emperors agreed to an armistice that led on to the fuller negotiations at Pressburg.

The Peace of Pressburg (Note: Also known as the Treaty of Pressburg; German: Preßburger Frieden; French: Traité de Presbourg. In Hungarian, the town was known as Pozsony.) was signed in Pressburg (today Bratislava) on 26 December 1805 between French Emperor Napoleon Bonaparte and Holy Roman Emperor Francis II, as a consequence of the French victory over the Russians and Austrians at the Battle of Austerlitz (2 December). A truce was agreed on 4 December, and negotiations for the treaty began. The treaty was signed by Johann I Joseph, Prince of Liechtenstein, and the Hungarian Count Ignác Gyulay for the Austrian Empire and Charles Maurice de Talleyrand for France.

== History ==
Beyond the clauses establishing "peace and amity" and the Austrian withdrawal from the Third Coalition, the treaty also mandated substantial territorial concessions by the Austrian Empire. The French gains of the previous treaties of Campo Formio and Lunéville were reiterated, while recent Austrian acquisitions in Italy and southern Germany were ceded to France and Bavaria, respectively. The scattered Austrian holdings in Swabia were passed to French allies – the King of Württemberg, and the Elector of Baden – while Bavaria received Tyrol and Vorarlberg. Austrian claims on those German states were renounced without exception. Venetia, Istria, and Dalmatia were incorporated into the Kingdom of Italy, of which Napoleon had become king earlier that year. The Principality of Lucca and Piombino was recognized as independent from the Holy Empire. Augsburg, previously an independent Free Imperial City, was ceded to Bavaria. As a minor compensation, the Austrian Empire annexed the Electorate of Salzburg, which had been under Habsburg rule since 1803. The elector, the Austrian Emperor's brother, was compensated with the Duchy of Würzburg, created from territories of the former prince-bishopric.

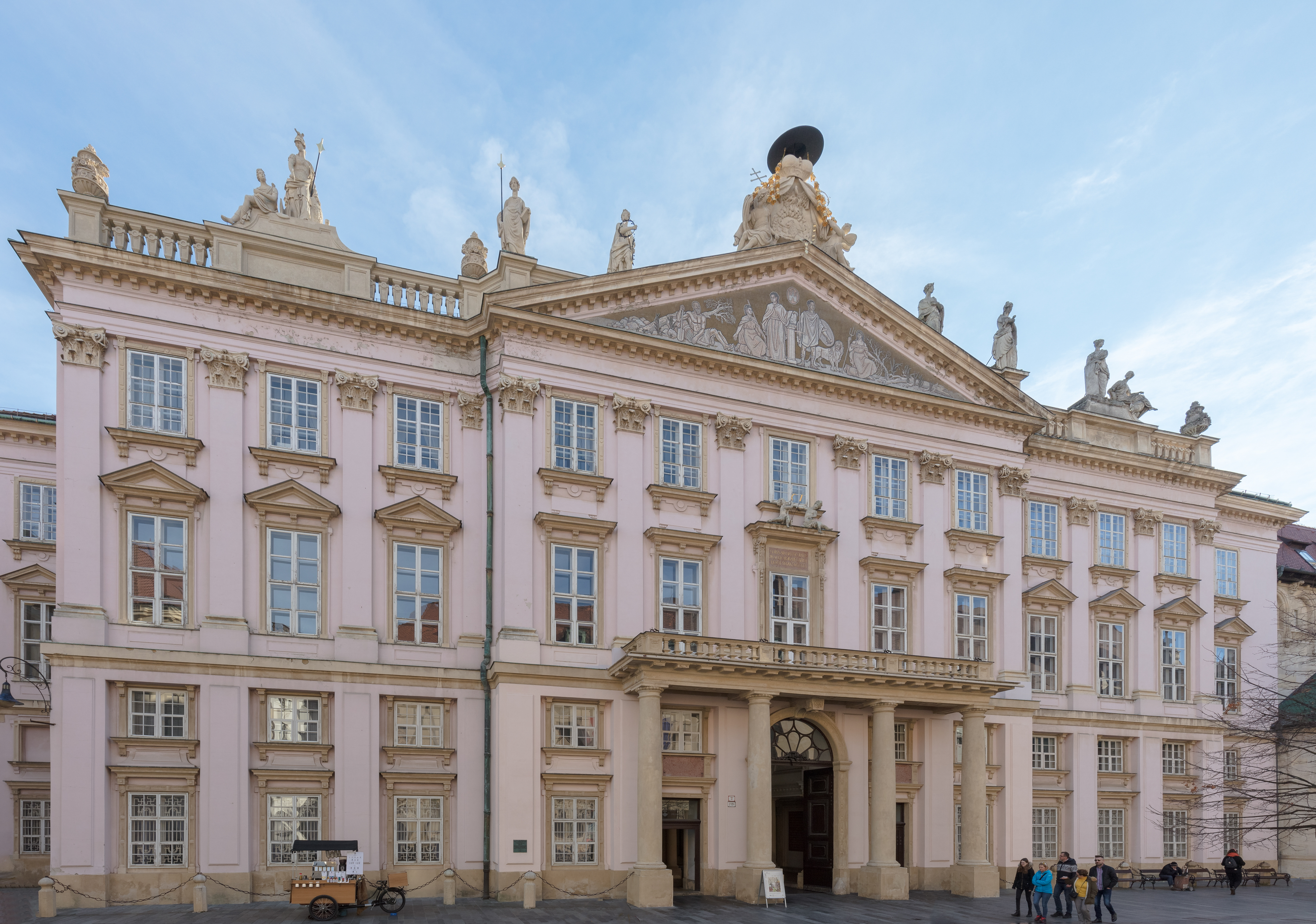
The Primate's Palace, where the Peace of Pressburg was signed

Francis II also recognized the kingly titles assumed by the Electors of Bavaria and Württemberg, which foreshadowed the end of the Holy Roman Empire. Within months of the signing of the treaty and after a new entity, the Confederation of the Rhine, had been created by Napoleon, Francis II renounced his title as Holy Roman Emperor. An indemnity of 40 million francs to France was also provided for in the treaty.

Some remaining territorial issues, including the effective establishment of the new border along the Isonzo river, were finally resolved by the Treaty of Fontainebleau (October 10, 1807).

== Sources ==
- Siemann, Wolfram (2019). Metternich: Strategist and Visionary. Cambridge: Harvard University Press. ISBN 978-0-674-74392-2.
