= Pfeddersheim =

- Stadtteil of Worms
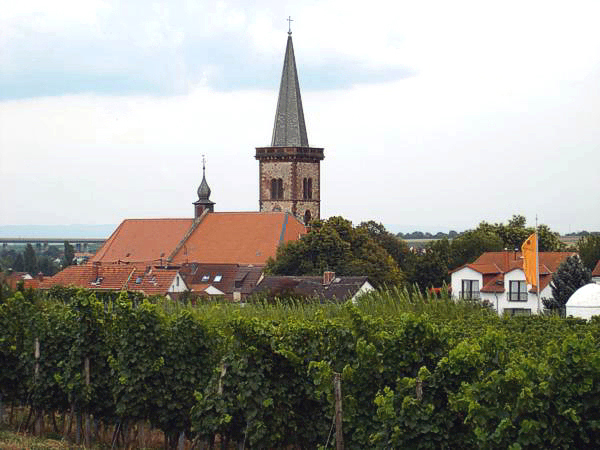
- Church and vineyards in Pfeddersheim

- Coat of arms
- Interactive map of Pfeddersheim
- Location within Germany Location within Rhineland-Palatinate
- Coordinates: 49°39′N 8°17′E
- Country: Germany
- State: Rhineland-Palatinate
- District: Urban district
- Town: Worms

Government
  - Mayor: Alfred Haag (SPD)

Population (2019-12-31)
  - Total: 7,011
- Time zone: UTC+01:00 (CET)
  - Summer (DST): UTC+02:00 (CEST)
- Postal codes: 67551
- Dialling codes: 06247
- Website: www.pfeddersheim.de

The former free imperial city Pfeddersheim (German: [ˈpfɛdɐs.haɪm], Palatine German pronunciation: [ˈpedɛʒm̩]) is a borough of Worms since 1969. It became a borough after 2,000 years of independent history.

Pfeddersheim is located in the Pfrimm valley in Rhenish Hesse and surrounded by Riesling vineyards. The well-preserved defensive towers and wall are tourist attractions, as are the synagogue and the Lutheran-Catholic Simultankirche (a church which contains a Lutheran and a Catholic church in one building). The village also has a school museum called Professor Bertleins Schulmuseum.

== History ==
Pfeddersheim was first mentioned in 754, the area was however occupied from Roman times, as archaeological evidence suggests. Its modern name is derived from the Latin Paternus. Pfeddersheim was owned by the Frankish kings from the 5th century onwards. They developed the village and it was given town privileges at around 1300 by King Albert I of Habsburg. The town became so rich and important that it became a member of the Rhenish City-League in 1381, like the cities of Frankfurt, Mainz, Strasburg and Worms. This freedom lasted only for a short while and Pfeddersheim came under the control of the Electoral Palatinate in 1465.

Several fierce battles were fought in the vicinity of Pfeddersheim. The German Peasants' War was crushed here on 23/24 June 1525, after the citizens of Pfeddersheim showed solidarity with the peasants. Thousands of peasants and citizens were killed in the Battle of Pfeddersheim. Pfeddersheim surrendered, together with Worms, to Louis V, Count Palatine of the Rhine and became Protestant, as did many regions in today's Rhineland-Palatinate. Pfeddersheim never recovered from the destructions in the Thirty Years' War and especially the War of the Palatine Succession and remained a small town after 1689.

Pfeddersheim became the capital of a canton of 24 villages in the département Mont-Tonnerre during the French occupation of the left bank of the Rhine in the Napoleonic Empire. In 1815 it became part of the Grand Duchy of Hesse. In 1874 it lost its town privileges, because it did not have enough citizens. It was granted these privileges again in 1954 by the new state Rhineland-Palatinate (in time for the 1200th anniversary of the founding of Pfeddersheim). It lost its town privileges again in 1969, when it was made a borough of Worms, despite a court challenge in the administrative court at Koblenz.

In Pfeddersheim, there is an old Jewish cemetery, which was used between 1837 and 1934.

== Pfeddersheim today ==
Pfeddersheim has celebrated the 1250th anniversary of its foundation. The yearly celebrations of Pfeddersheim are the Pfeddersheimer Markt (lit. Pfeddersheim's Market), a yearly funfair and the Pfeddersheimer Weinbrunnen (lit. Pfeddersheim's Wine fountain), a yearly wine fest.

The local football team TSG Pfeddersheim is known in the region since it played in the Oberliga Südwest from 1992 to 2000 and missed promotion to the Regionalliga West/Südwest in 1996.

Pfeddersheim has a public outdoor swimming pool.

== Transportation ==
The train station of Pfeddersheim lies on the Rhenish Hesse line (Worms – Alzey – Bingen). Trains stop here every 30mins and every hour at weekends. The borough is connected to Worms by public transport.

Pfeddersheim lies on the B 47 and near the exit Worms of the A 61. The A 61 spans the valley of the Pfrimm east of Pfeddersheim.

== Pictures ==
Defensive Tower Pfeddersheim	Simultankirche Pfeddersheim
