= Grand Duchy of Würzburg =

German state (1805–1814)

Grand Duchy of Würzburg Großherzogtum Würzburg (German)
- 1805–1814
- Flag Coat of arms

- The Grand Duchy of Würzburg in 1812
- Status: Client state of France and State of the Confederation of the Rhine
- Capital: Würzburg
- Common languages: German
- Religion: Roman Catholic
- Government: Absolute monarchy
- Duke and Prince-Elector to 1806, Grand Duke from 1806
  - 1805–1814: Ferdinand I
- Historical era: Napoleonic era
  - Peace of Pressburg: 26 December 1805
  - Congress of Vienna: 3 June 1814
Preceded by	Succeeded by
Prince-Bishopric of Würzburg	Kingdom of Bavaria

The Grand Duchy of Würzburg (German: Großherzogtum Würzburg) was a German grand duchy centered on Würzburg existing in the Napoleonic era.

== History ==
As a consequence of the 1801 Treaty of Lunéville, the Bishopric of Würzburg was secularized in 1803 and granted to the Electorate of Bavaria. In the same year Ferdinand III, former Grand Duke of Tuscany, was compensated with the Electorate of Salzburg. In the Peace of Pressburg on 26 December 1805, Ferdinand lost Salzburg to the Austrian Empire but was compensated with the Würzburg territory, Bavaria having relinquished it in return for Tyrol.

Ferdinand’s new state was initially known as the Electorate of Würzburg (Kurfürstentum Würzburg). After the dissolution of the Holy Roman Empire on 6 August 1806, the territory was elevated to the Grand Duchy of Würzburg.The new state joined the Confederation of the Rhine on 30 September 1806 as part of Napoleon’s reorganisation of the German political order. In 1810 the Grand Duchy acquired the territory of Schweinfurt, further consolidating its position within Franconia.

After Napoleon's defeat at the Battle of Leipzig, Ferdinand dissolved his alliance with the First French Empire on 26 October 1813. Through an Austrian-Bavarian treaty of 3 June 1814, Ferdinand lost his possessions to the Kingdom of Bavaria and the Grand Duchy was dissolved. Ferdinand was restored to a reconstituted Grand Duchy of Tuscany by the Congress of Vienna. The Roman Catholic Diocese of Würzburg remained as an ecclesiastical institution without temporal power, but was reformed in 1818 after the Concordat of 24 October 1817 with Bavaria.
