= Quaternion Eagle =

Unofficial coat of arms of the Holy Roman Empire

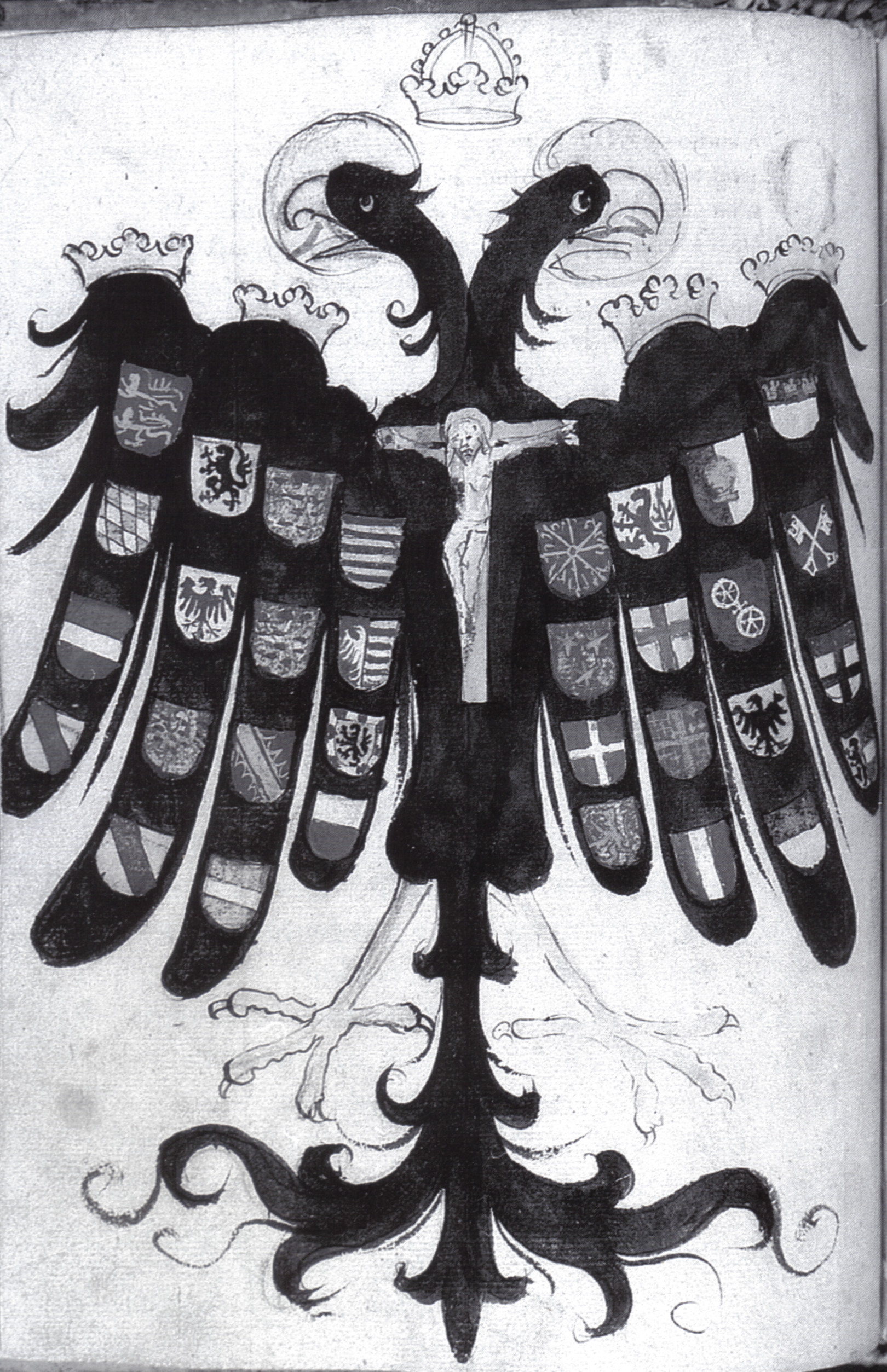
A 15th-century Quaternion Eagle by Heinrich van Beeck

The Quaternion Eagle (German: Quaternionenadler; Italian: aquila quaternione), also known as the Imperial Quaternion Eagle (German: Quaternionen-Reichsadler) or simply Imperial Eagle (German: Reichsadler), (Note: The Reichsadler or 'Imperial Eagle' of the Holy Roman Empire is a pre-existing concept, itself based on the Imperial Eagle of the ancient Roman Empire. Nonetheless, the Imperial Eagle beaker refers to the Quaternion Eagle.) was an informal emblem of the Holy Roman Empire. It mixed two pre-existing concepts: the Imperial Quaternions and the Imperial Eagle (double-headed eagle).

== History ==
=== Background ===
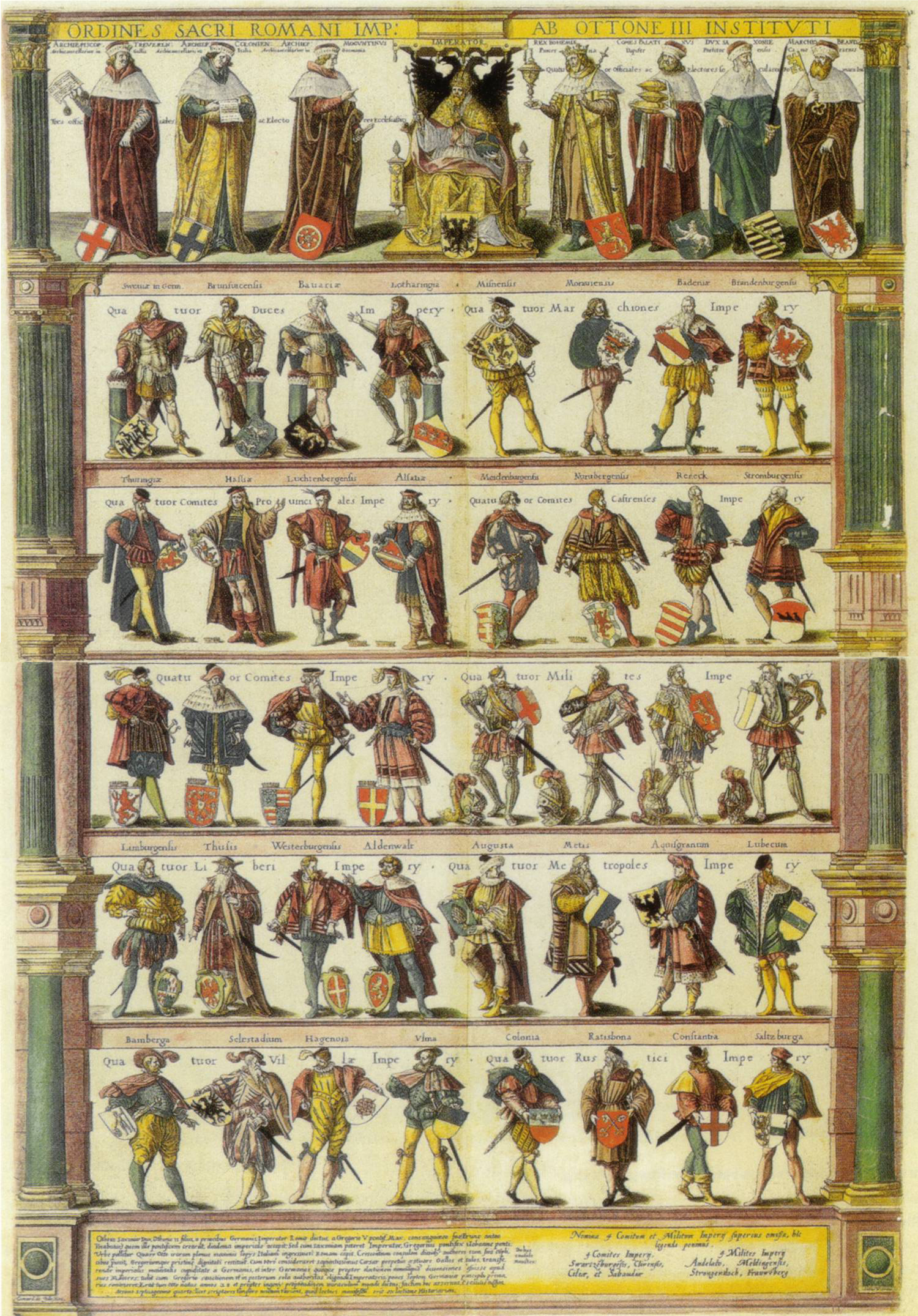
Engraving by Anton III Wierix showing the emperor and his electors above the ten quaternions, 1606

The so-called imperial quaternions (German: Quaternionen der Reichsverfassung, "quaternions of the imperial constitution"; from Latin quaternio, "set of four") were a conventional representation of the empire's constitution that first became current in the 15th century and was extremely popular during the 16th century. Each of the estates making up the empire was represented by a group of four, called a quaternion. The number of quaternions was usually ten, in descending order of precedence:

1. Dukes (Duces),
2. Margraves (Marchiones),
3. Landgraves (Comites Provinciales),
4. Burggraves (Comites Castrenses),
5. Counts (Comites),
6. Knights (Milites),
7. Noblemen (Liberi),
8. Cities (Metropoles),
9. Villages (Villae),
10. Peasants (Rustici).

The list could be shortened or expanded, by the mid-16th century to as many as 45.

It is likely that this system was first introduced under Emperor Sigismund, who is assumed to have commissioned the frescoes in Frankfurt city hall in 1414.

As has been noted from an early time, this representation does not represent the actual constitution of the Holy Roman Empire, as some imperial cities appear as "villages" or even "peasants" (Note: E.g. the four "peasants" are Cologne, Constance, Regensburg and Salzburg.) and the Burggrave of Stromburg (Note: Or Straburg, Strandeck, and variants.) was an unknown entity even at the time. The representation of imperial subjects is also far from complete. The "imperial quaternions" are, rather, a more or less random selection intended to represent pars pro toto the structure of the empire.

=== Emblem of the Empire ===
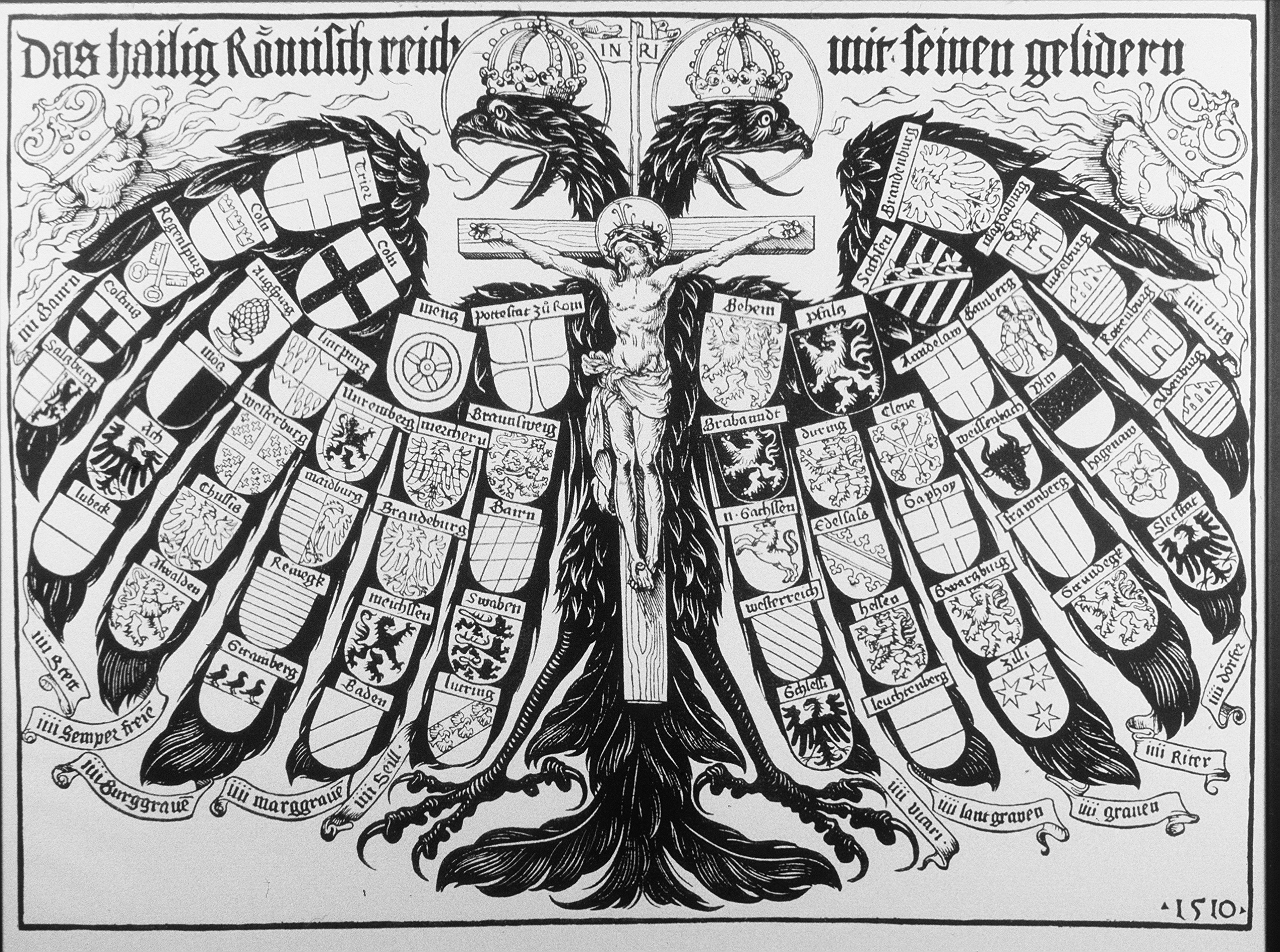
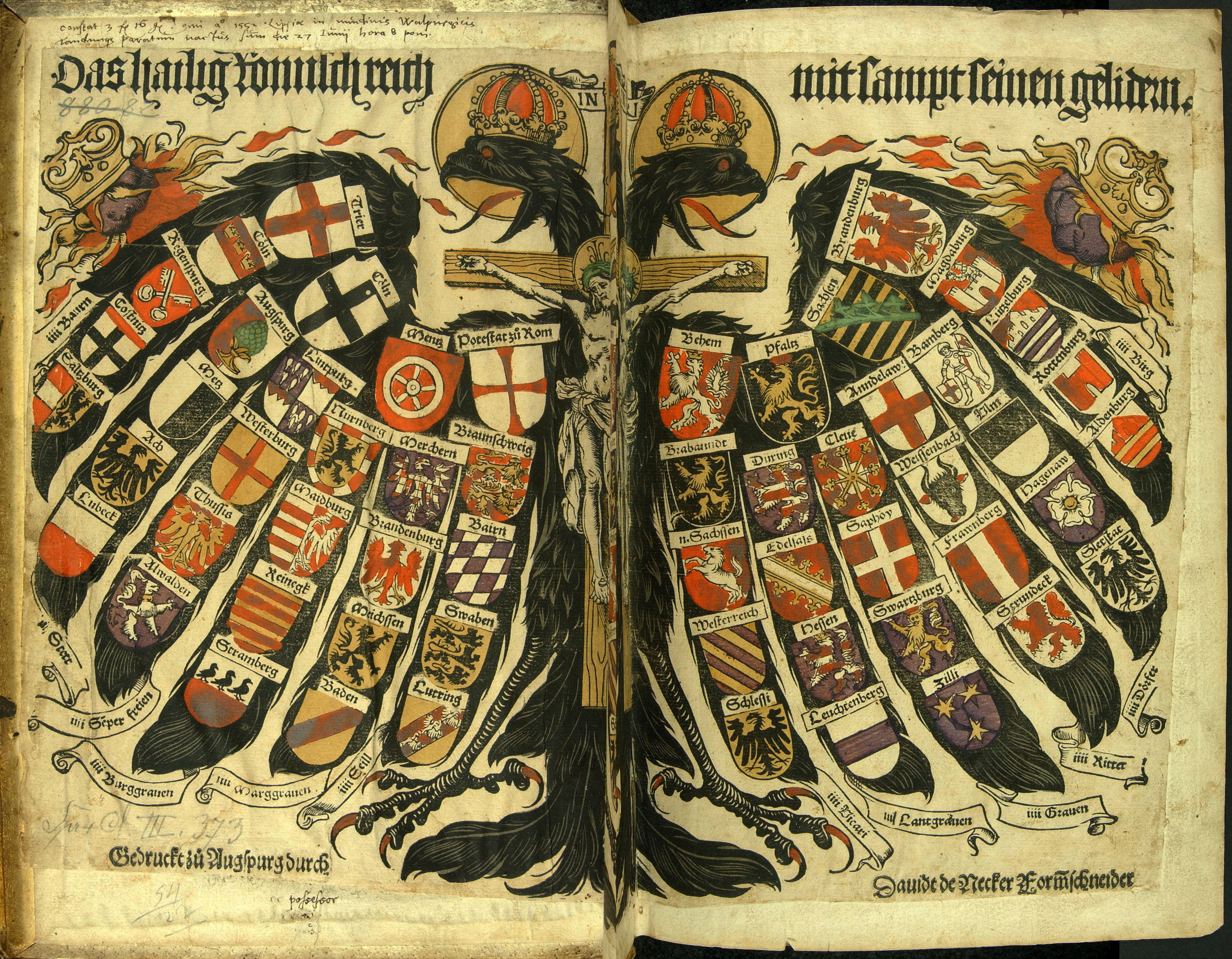
Woodcut by Hans Burgkmair, c. 1510, hand-coloured by Jost de Negker, and its digital rendition.

Over its long history, the Holy Roman Empire used many different heraldic forms, representing its numerous internal divisions. One was the Quaternion Eagle, printed by David de Negker of Augsburg after a 1510 woodcut by Hans Burgkmair.

Named after the imperial quaternions, it showed a selection of 56 shields of various Imperial States in groups of four on the feathers of a double-headed eagle (the imperial eagle's remiges), supporting, in place of a shield, Christ on the Cross.

- The four Spiritual (geistliche) Electors: Trier, Cöln (Cologne), Mentz (Mainz), Potestat zu Rom (Holy See)
- The four Mundane Temporal (weltliche): Böhmen (Bohemia), Pfalz (Palatinate), Sachsen (Saxony), Brandenburg
- Seill ("pillars"): Braunschweig, Bairn (Bayern, Bavaria), Swaben (Schwaben, Swabia), Lutring (Lothringen, Lotharingia)
- Vicarii ("vicars"): Brabandt (Brabant), n.Sachsen (Niedersachsen, Lower Saxony), Westerreich (Westrich), Schlessi (Schlesien, Silesia)
- Marggraven (margraves): Merchern (Mähren, Moravia), Brandenburg, Meichssen (Meißen), Baden
- Lantgraven (landgraves): Thüringen (Thuringia), Elsaß, Hessen, Leuchtenberg
- Burggraven (burggraves): Nürnberg (Nuremberg), Maidburg (Hardegg-Maidburg), Reineck (Rieneck), Stramberg (Stromberg)
- Graven (counts): Cleve, Saphoy (Savoyen, Savoy), Swartzburg (Schwarzburg), Zilli (Celje)
- Semperfreie (nobles): Lintpurg (Limpurg), Westerburg, Thussis (Thusis), Alwalden (Aldenwalden)
- Ritter (knights): Anndelaw (Andlau), Weissenbach, Frawnberg (Fraunberg), Strundeck ("Stromdeck")
- Stett (cities): Augspurg (Augsburg), Metz, Ach (Aachen), Lubeck (Lübeck)
- Dörfer (villages): Bamberg, Ulm, Hagenaw (Hagenau), Sletstat (Schlettstatt)
- Bauern (peasants): Cöln (Köln, Cologne), Regenspurg (Regensburg), Costnitz, Salzburg
- Birg (castles): Magdaburg (Magdeburg), Lützelburg, Rottenburg, Aldenburg

Twelve vertical quaternions were shown under them, as follows — eight dukes being divided into two quaternions called "pillars" and "vicars", respectively:

Right wing
1. Seill ("pillars"),
3. Marggrauen (margraves),
5. Burggrauen (burggraves),
7. Semper freie (nobles),
9. Stett (cities),
11. Bauern (peasants),

Left wing
2. Vicari ("vicars"),
4. Lantgrauen (landgraves),
6. Grauen (counts),
8. Ritter (knights),
10. Dörfer (villages),
12. Birg (castles).

The depiction also appeared on the Imperial Eagle beaker.

== Imperial Eagle beaker ==
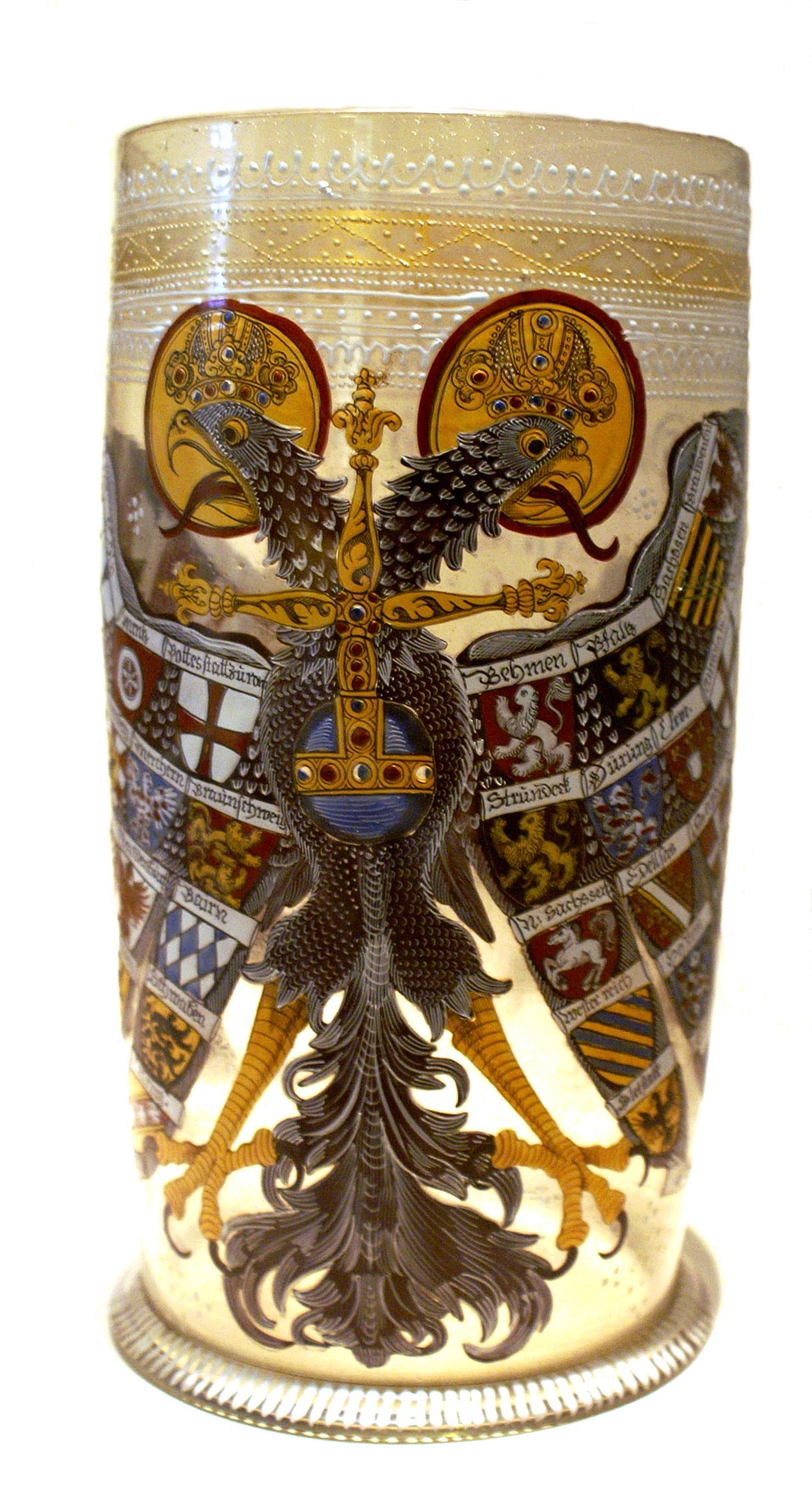
An example of a Reichsadlerhumpen on display at the Deutsches Historisches Museum

An Imperial Eagle beaker (German: Reichsadlerhumpen), or eagle glass, was a popular drinking vessel from the 16th until the late 18th century in the Holy Roman Empire. The enamelled glass was decorated with a double-headed eagle, usually in the shape of a Quaternion Eagle. The Reichsadler means "Imperial Eagle" or double-headed eagle which was the emblem of the empire, while "humpen" refers to a cylindrical drinking glass. These beakers became the essential medium to represent the most popular explanatory model for the emergence of the Empire: the quaternion theory as represented by Hans Burgkmair.

The Imperial Eagle beakers showed the solidarity between the owner and the Empire and were very popular because of their decorativeness and luminous colors. But these drinking vessels were also valued for their generous size. Equally popular were the electors' beakers, which were decorated with illustrations of the emperor and electors as the most important representatives of the Empire.

Many good examples of Imperial Eagle beakers are on display in museums worldwide. At auctions well-preserved pieces achieve a selling price of up to several thousand euros.

== See also ==
- Coats of arms of the Holy Roman Empire
- Reichsadler
- Imperial Eagle
- Imperial Quaternions

== Bibliography ==
- Panvinio, Onofrio (1558). De Comitiis Imperatoriis (in Latin). Basel.
- Goldast von Haiminsfeld, Melchior (1607). Constitutiones imperiales (in Latin). Frankfurt.
- Goldast von Haiminsfeld, Melchior (1612). Monarchia sacri Romani imperii (in Latin). Hanover & Frankfurt.
- Knorr von Rosenroth, Christian (1672). Anführung zur Teutschen Staats-Kunst [Introduction to the German State Art] (in German). Hofmann – via Google Books.
- Spener, Jacob Carl [in German] (1723). Teutsches ivs pvblicvm; oder, des Heil. Römisch-Teutschen Reichs vollständige Staats-Rechts-Lehre [German ivs pvblicvm; or, complete state-legal doctrine of the Holy Roman-German Empire] (in German). Vol. 1. George Marcus Knoche – via Google Books.
- Legband, Hans (1905). "Zu den Quaternionen der Reichsverfassung" [On the Quaternions of the Imperial Constitution]. Archiv für Kulturgeschichte (in German). 3: 495–498.
- Bund, Konrad (1987). Findbuch der Epitaphienbücher (1238)–1928 und der Wappenbücher (1190)–1801 [Inventory of the epitaph books (1238)–1928 and the heraldic books (1190)–1801] (in German). Kramer. ISBN 3782903315.
- Schubert, Ernst (1993). "Die Quaternionen" [The Quaternions]. Zeitschrift für historische Forschung (in German). 20: 1–63.
- Ocker, Christopher (2018). "The Imperial Quaternion Eagle (Augsburg, c. 1510)". Luther, Conflict, and Christendom. Cambridge University Press. pp. IX, 101–122. doi:10.1017/9781108178624. ISBN 9781108178624. S2CID 165918623.
- Rödel, Volker (2018). "Kaiser Maximilians Westreich und der Quaternionen-Reichsadler" [Emperor Maximilian's Western Empire and the Imperial Quaternion Eagle]. Francia (in German). 45. German Historical Institute Paris: 85–116. doi:10.11588/fr.2018.0.70110 – via Max Weber Foundation.
