= Imperial Estate =

Constituent state of the Holy Roman Empire with representation in the Imperial Diet

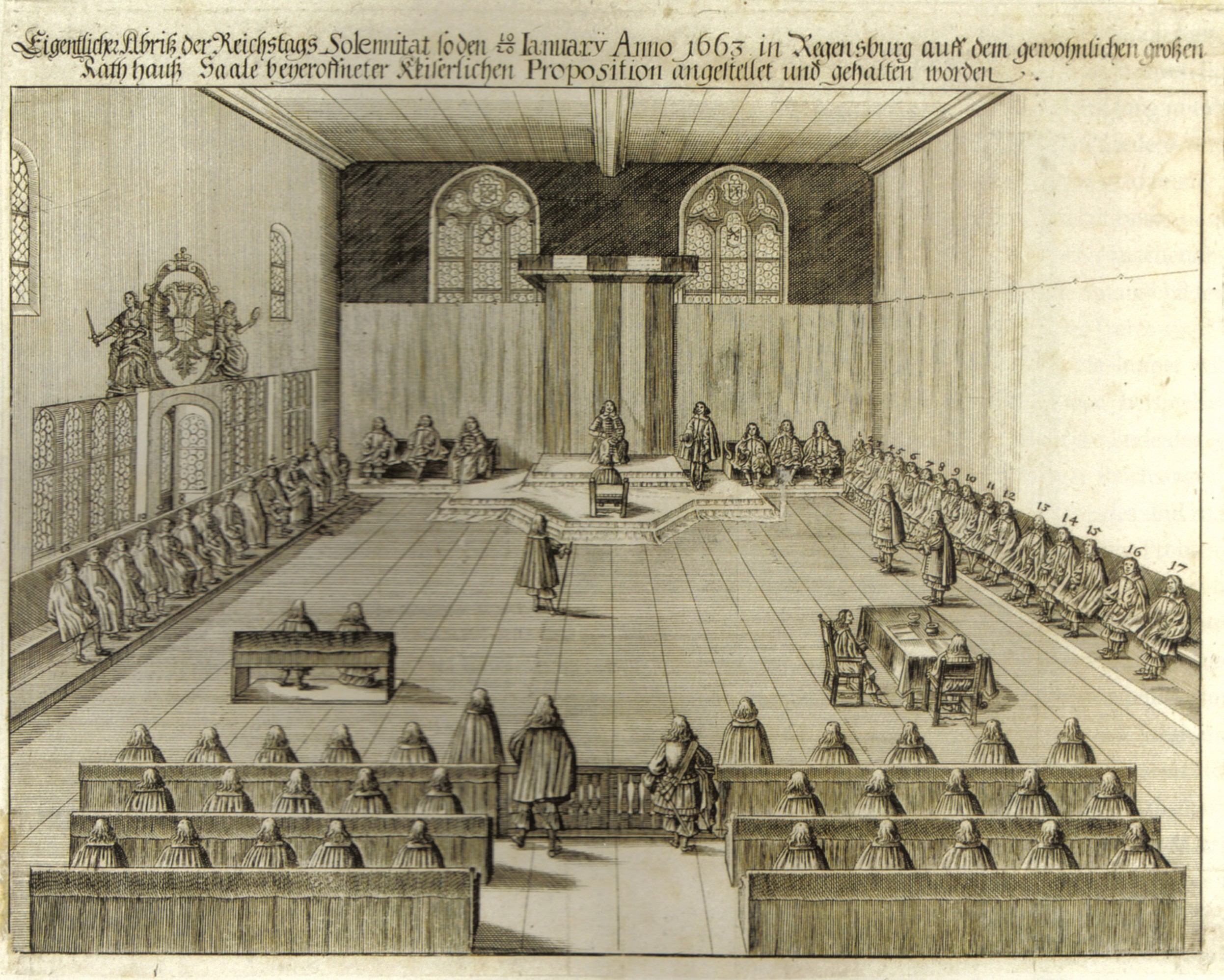
Seating order of the Perpetual Diet of Regensburg (1663 engraving)

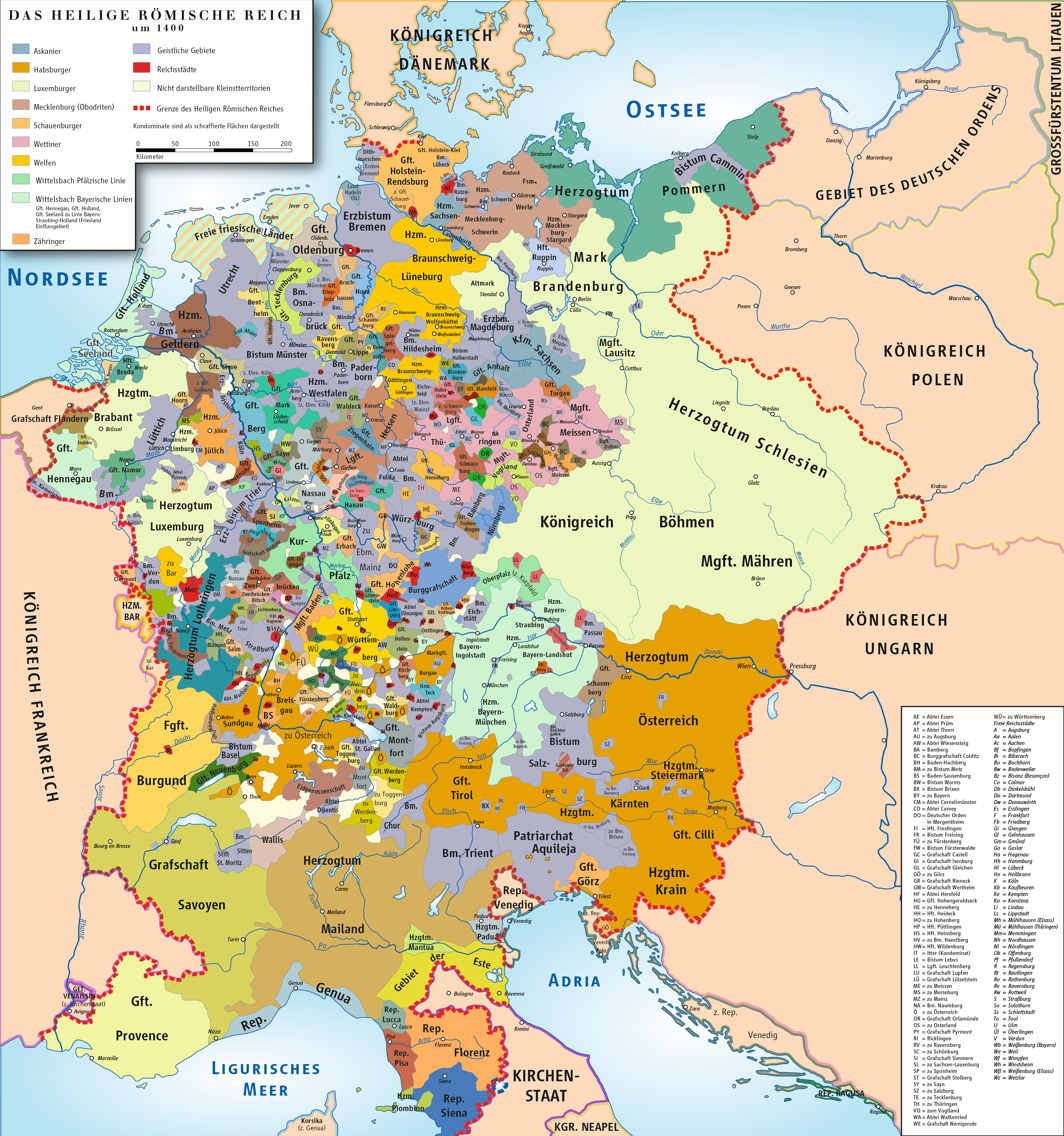
Map of the Holy Roman Empire in 1400

An Imperial Estate (Latin: Status Imperii; German: Reichsstand, plural: Reichsstände) was an entity or an individual of the Holy Roman Empire with representation and the right to vote in the Imperial Diet (Reichstag). Rulers of these Estates were able to exercise significant rights and privileges and were "immediate", meaning the only authority above them was that of the Holy Roman Emperor. They were thus able to rule their territories with a considerable degree of autonomy.

The system of imperial states replaced the more regular division of Germany into stem duchies in the early medieval period. The old Carolingian stem duchies were retained as the major divisions of Germany under the Salian dynasty, but they became increasingly obsolete during the early high medieval period under the Hohenstaufen, and they were finally abolished in 1180 by Frederick Barbarossa in favour of more numerous territorial divisions. From 1489, the Imperial Estates represented in the Diet were divided into three chambers, the college of prince-electors (Kurfürstenkollegium/den Kurfürstenrat), the college of imperial princes (Reichsfürstenrat) and the college of imperial cities. Counts and nobles were not directly represented in the Diet in spite of their immediate status, but were grouped into "benches" (Grafenbänke) with a single vote each. Imperial Knights and imperial villages had immediate status but were not represented in the Diet.

== Composition ==
Map of the Holy Roman Empire in 1648

Imperial Estates could be either ecclesiastic or secular. The ecclesiastical Estates were led by:

- the three clerical Prince-electors: the Archbishops of Cologne, Mainz and Trier;
- Prince-Archbishops and Prince-Bishops as well as Prince-Abbots and Prince-Provosts of the Empire;
- Imperial Prelates, immediate Priors and Provosts;
- Grand Masters of military orders like the Teutonic Knights or Knights Hospitaller.

The secular Estates, most notably:

- the four Prince-Electors of the County Palatine of the Rhine, Saxony, Brandenburg and Bohemia, later also Bavaria (replacing the Palatinate) and Hanover.
- Imperial Princes including Grand Dukes, Dukes, Counts Palatine, Margraves and Landgraves;
- Imperial Counts, Burgraves, Barons, and prelates;
- the Free and Imperial cities.

Until 1582 the votes of the Free and Imperial Cities were only advisory. None of the rulers below the Holy Roman Emperor ranked as kings, with the exception of the Kings of Bohemia.

The status of Estate was normally attached to a particular territory within the Empire, but there were some reichsständische Personalisten, or "persons with Imperial statehood". Originally, the Emperor alone could grant that status, but in 1653, several restrictions on the Emperor's power were introduced. The creation of a new Estate required the assent of the College of Electors and of the College of Princes (see Reichstag below). The ruler was required to agree to accept Imperial taxation and military obligations. Furthermore, the Estate was required to obtain admittance into one of the Imperial Circles. Theoretically, personalist Estates were forbidden after 1653, but exceptions were often made. Once a territory attained the status of an Estate, it could only lose that status under very few circumstances. A territory ceded to a foreign power ceased to be an Estate.

From 1648 onwards, inheritance of the Estate was limited to one family; a territory inherited by a different family ceased to be an Estate unless the Emperor explicitly allowed otherwise. Finally, a territory could cease to be an Imperial Estate by being subjected to the Imperial ban (the most notable example involved Frederick V, Elector Palatine, who was banned in 1621 for his participation in the Bohemian Revolt).

In the German mediatization between 1803 and 1806, the vast majority of the Estates of the Holy Roman Empire were mediatised. They lost their Imperial immediacy and became part of other Estates. The number of Estates was reduced from about three hundred to about thirty. Mediatisation went along with secularisation: the abolition of most of the ecclesiastical Estates. This dissolution of the constitution of the structure of the empire was soon followed by the dissolution of the empire itself, in 1806.

== Rights and privileges ==
Rulers of Imperial States enjoyed precedence over other subjects in the Empire. Electors were originally styled Durchlaucht (Serene Highness), princes Hochgeboren (high-born) and counts Hoch- und Wohlgeboren (high and well-born). In the eighteenth century, the electors were upgraded to Durchläuchtigste (Most Serene Highness), princes to Durchlaucht (Serene Highness) and counts to Erlaucht (Illustrious Highness).

Imperial States enjoyed several rights and privileges. Rulers had autonomy inasmuch as their families were concerned; in particular, they were permitted to make rules regarding the inheritance of their states without imperial interference. They were permitted to make treaties and enter into alliances with other Imperial States as well as with foreign nations. The electors, but not the other rulers, were permitted to exercise certain regalian powers, including the power to mint money, the power to collect tolls and a monopoly over gold and silver mines.

== Imperial Diet ==
From 1489 onwards, the Imperial Diet was divided into three collegia: the Council of Electors, the Council of Princes, and the Council of Cities. Electoral states belonged to the Council of Electors; other states, whether ecclesiastical or secular, belonged to the Council of Princes.

Votes were held in right of the states, rather than personally. Consequently, an individual ruling several states held multiple votes; similarly, multiple individuals ruling parts of the same state shared a single vote. These rules were not formalized until 1582; before then, when multiple individuals inherited parts of the same state, they sometimes received a vote each. Votes were either individual or collective. Princes and senior clerics generally held individual votes (but such votes, as noted above, were sometimes shared). Prelates (abbots and priors) without individual votes were classified into two benches: the Bench of the Rhine and the Bench of Swabia. Each of these had a collective vote. Similarly, Counts were grouped into four comital benches with one collective vote each: the Upper Rhenish Bench of Wetterau, the Swabian Bench, the Franconian Bench and the Westphalian Bench.

No elector ever held multiple electorates; nor were electorates ever divided between multiple heirs. Hence, in the Council of Electors, each individual held exactly one vote. An example of this was when Charles Theodore, Elector Palatine, inherited the Electorate of Bavaria in 1777, the vote of the Palatinate was nullified. However, Electors who ruled states in addition to their electorates also voted in the Council of Princes; similarly, princes who also ruled comital territories voted both individually and in the comital benches. In the Reichstag in 1792, for instance, the Elector of Brandenburg held eight individual votes in the Council of Princes and one vote in the Bench of Westphalia. Similarly, among ecclesiastics, the Grand Master of the Teutonic Order held one individual vote in the Council of Princes and two in the Bench of the Rhine.

== Quaternions ==
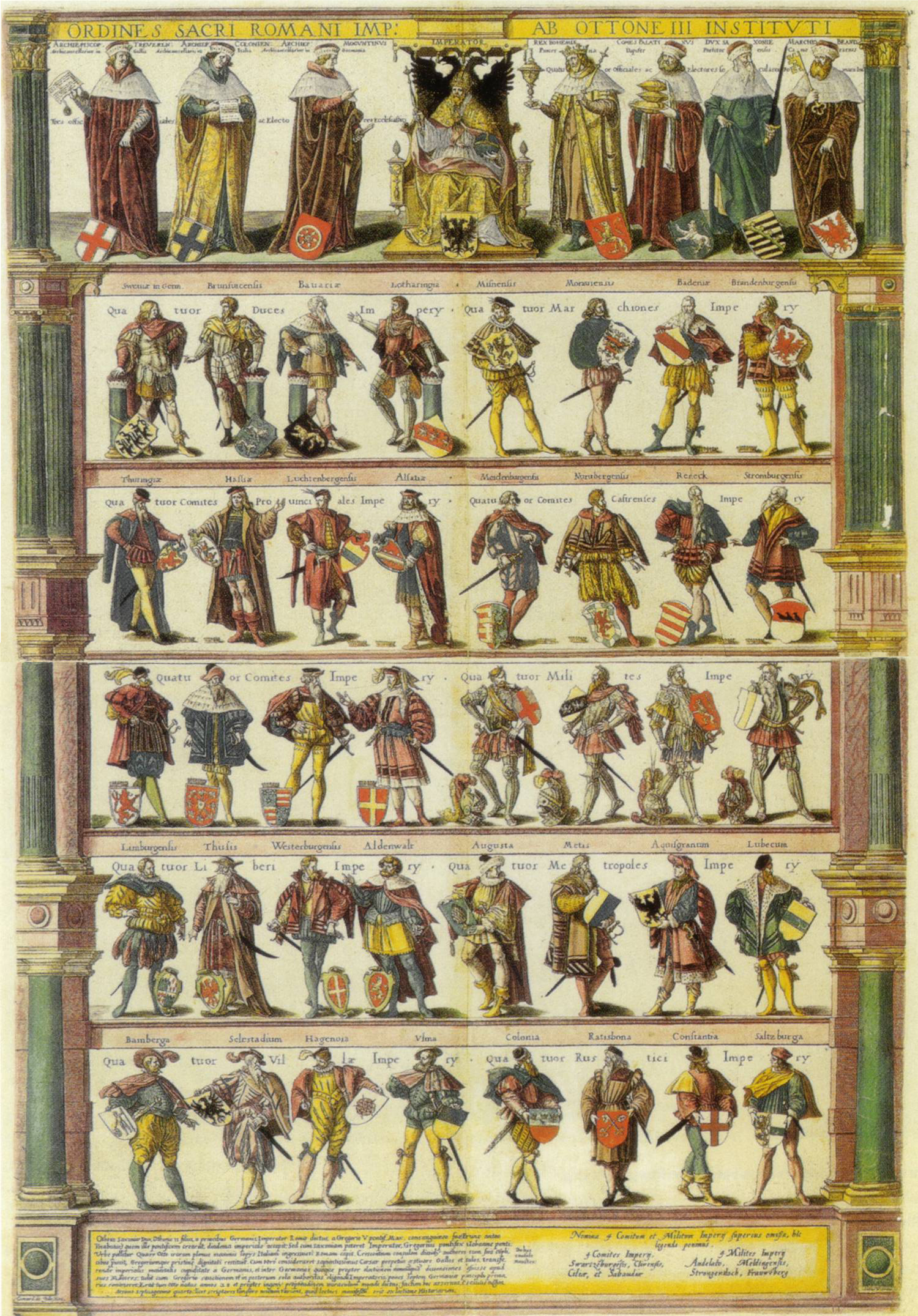
Typical representation of the quaternions (Anton III Wierix 1606). The ten quaternions are shown underneath the emperor flanked by the prince-electors (Archbishop of Trier, Archbishop of Cologne, Archbishop of Mainz; King of Bohemia, Count Palatine, Duke of Saxony, Margrave of Brandenburg).

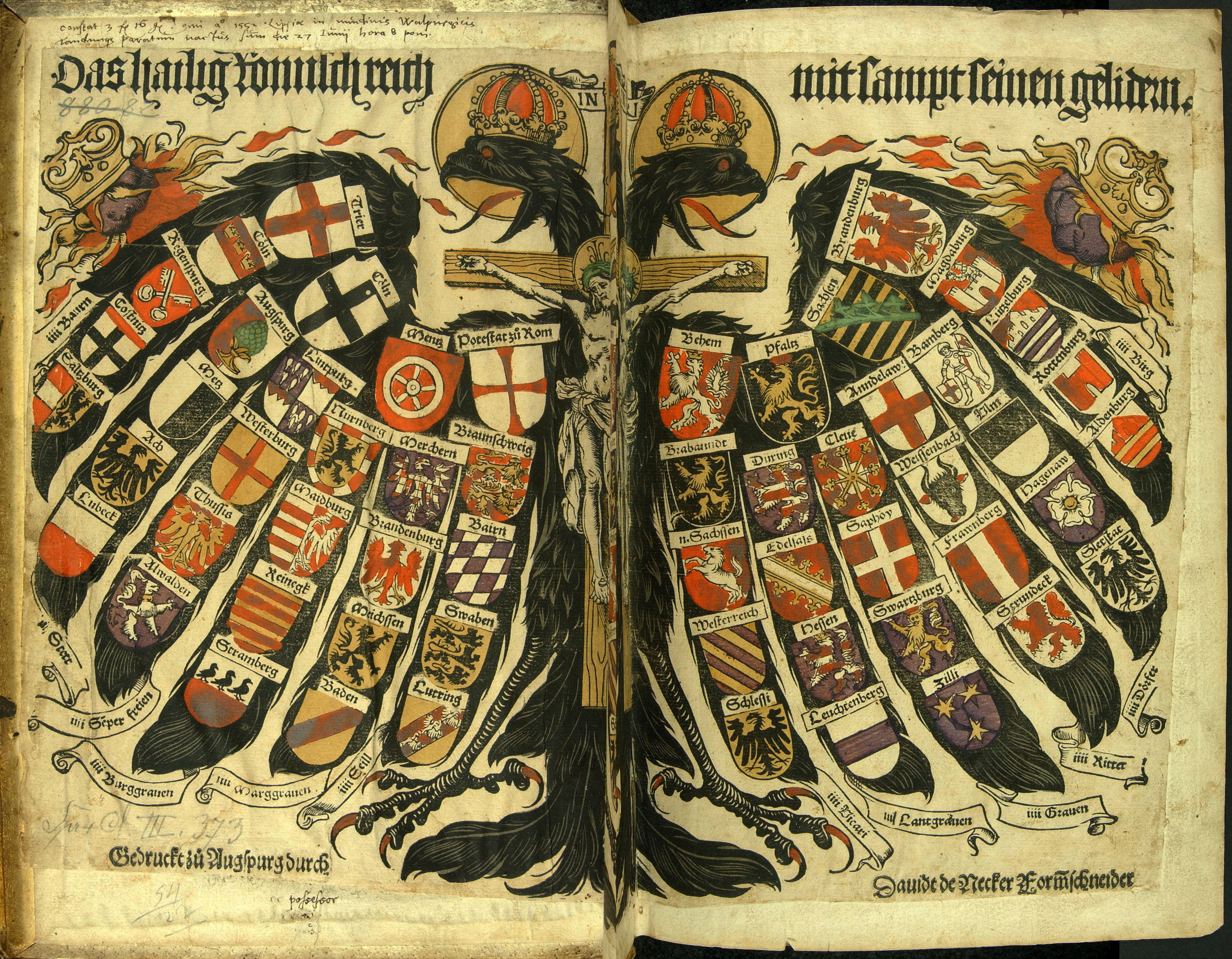
A "Quaternion Eagle" (each quaternion being represented by four coats of arms on the imperial eagle's remiges) Hans Burgkmair, c. 1510. Twelve quaternions are shown, as follows (eight dukes being divided into two quaternions called "pillars" and "vicars", respectively): Seill ("pillars"), Vicari ("vicars"), Marggraven (margraves), Lantgraven (landgraves), Burggraven (burggraves), Graven (counts), Semper freie (nobles), Ritter (knights), Stett (cities), Dörfer (villages), Bauern (peasants), Birg (castles).

The so-called imperial quaternions (German: Quaternionen der Reichsverfassung "quaternions of the imperial constitution"; from Latin quaterniō "group of four soldiers") were a conventional representation of the Imperial States of the Holy Roman Empire which first became current in the 15th century and was extremely popular during the 16th century.

Apart from the highest tiers of the emperor, kings, prince-bishops and the prince electors, the estates are represented in groups of four. The number of quaternions was usually ten, in descending order of precedence Dukes (Duces), Margraves (Marchiones), Landgraves (Comites Provinciales), Burggraves (Comites Castrenses), Counts (Comites), Knights (Milites), Noblemen (Liberi), Cities (Metropoles), Villages (Villae) and Peasants (Rustici). The list could be shortened or expanded, by the mid-16th century to as many as 45.

It is likely that this system was first introduced under Emperor Sigismund, who is assumed to have commissioned the frescoes in Frankfurt city hall in 1414.

As has been noted from an early time, this representation of the "imperial constitution" does not in fact represent the actual constitution of the Holy Roman Empire, as some imperial cities appear as "villages" or even "peasants". E.g. the four "peasants" are Cologne, Constance, Regensburg and Salzburg. The Burggrave of Stramberg (or Stromberg, Straburg, Strandeck, and variants) was an unknown entity even at the time. The representation of imperial subjects is also far from complete. The "imperial quaternions" are, rather, a more or less random selection intended to represent pars pro toto the structure of the imperial constitution.

== See also ==
- Princes of the Holy Roman Empire
- List of Imperial Diet participants (1792)
- List of states in the Holy Roman Empire
- Estates of the realm
- Stem duchy
- Feudalism in the Holy Roman Empire
- Heerschild
