= Coats of arms of the Holy Roman Empire =

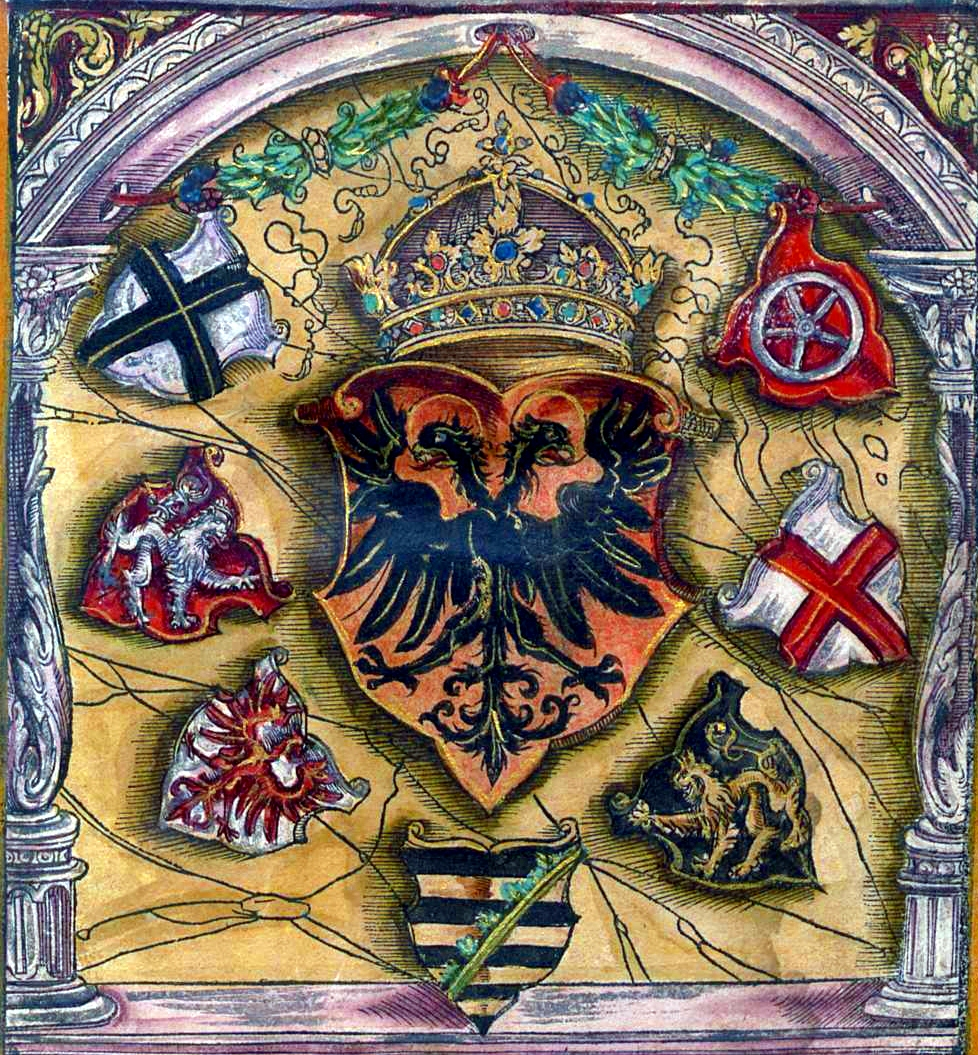
Coats of arms of prince electors surrounding the double-headed Reichsadler (1545).

Over its long history, the Holy Roman Empire used many different heraldic forms, representing its numerous internal divisions.

== Imperial coat of arms ==
Greater Coat of arms of emperor Joseph II, c. 1765–1790

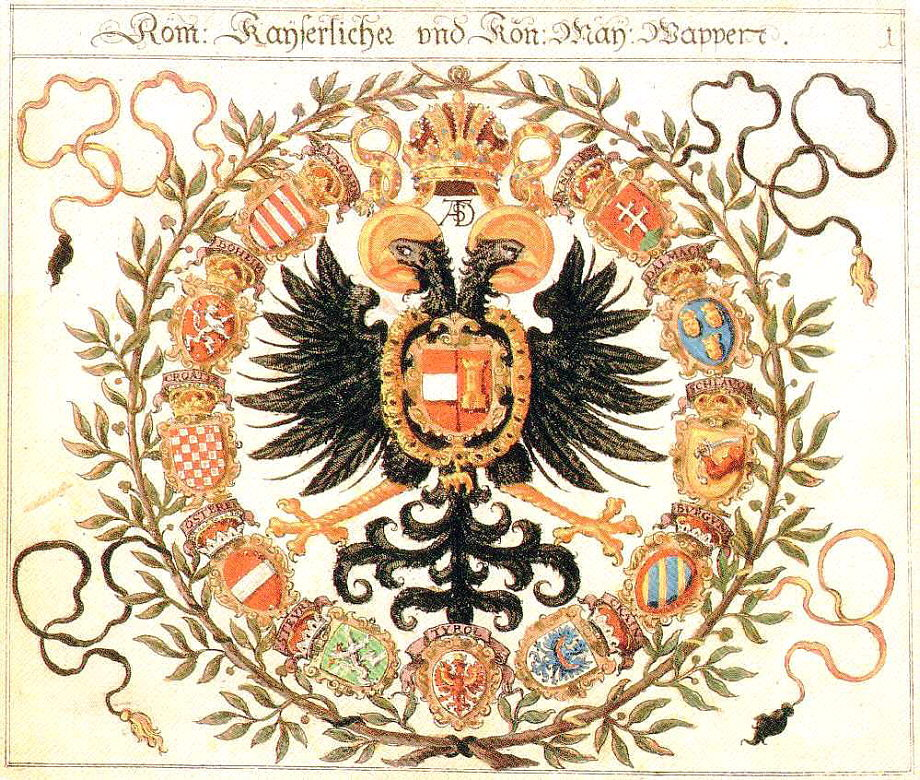
Imperial Habsburg coat of arms, for Rudolf II, from Siebmachers Wappenbuch (1605). The surrounding coats of arms represent Habsburg possessions, the inescutcheon exceptionally combines the Austrian and Castilian arms, for Habsburg Austria and Habsburg Spain.

=== Coats of arms of Holy Roman Emperors ===
The Reichsadler ("Imperial Eagle") was the heraldic eagle, derived from the Roman eagle standard, used by the Holy Roman Emperors and in modern coats of arms of Germany, including those of the Second German Empire (1871–1918), the Weimar Republic (1919–1933) and the "Third Reich" (Nazi Germany, 1933–1945). The same design has remained in use by the Federal Republic of Germany since 1945, but under a different name, now called Bundesadler ("Union Eagle" or "Federal Eagle", from German "Bund", genitive form "Bundes" meaning 'Union' or 'Federation', and "Adler" meaning 'Eagle').

=== Quaternion Eagle ===
The Quaternion Eagle, hand-coloured woodcut (c. 1510) by Hans Burgkmair.

One rendition of the coat of the empire was the "Quaternion Eagle" (so named after the imperial quaternions) printed by David de Negker of Augsburg, after a 1510 woodcut by Hans Burgkmair. It showed a selection of 56 shields of various Imperial States in groups of four on the feathers of a double-headed eagle supporting, in place of a shield, Christ on the Cross. The top, larger shields, are those of the seven Prince Electors, the ecclesiastical: Trier, Cologne and Mainz as well as of the titular "Prefect of Rome" on the right wing; the secular: Bohemia, Electorate of the Palatinate, Saxony and Brandenburg on the left. The depiction also appeared on the Imperial Eagle beaker.

== Holy Roman Emperors ==
Direct attestations of imperial coats of arms become available in the later 13th century. Past emperors are given attributed arms in 13th-century sources. Thus, Otto IV is given the first known depiction of a double-headed Reichsadler in the Chronica Majora (c. 1250). Henry VI is given a (single-headed) Reichsadler in the Codex Manesse (c. 1320).

Frederick II of Hohenstaufen (Emperor 1220–1250) did not use coats of arms in any of his seals. He did use the imperial eagle on some of his coins, but not displayed as a heraldic charge in a heraldic shield. Frederick's son and co-ruler Henry did have an equestrian seal with the Hohenstaufen coat of arms of three leopards, and this coat of arms is later attributed to Frederick II as well.

From the reign of Albert II (reigned 1438–39, was never crowned emperor), each Emperor bore the old Imperial arms (Or, an eagle displayed sable beaked and membered gules) with an inescutcheon of pretence of his personal family arms. This appears therefore as a black eagle with an escutcheon on his breast. Before 1438 the Emperors used separate personal and an imperial coat of arms. The arms of the High Offices of the Empire were borne as an augmentation to the office-holder's personal arms.

Personal arms	Imperial arms	Name/Blazon of personal arms
		1308–1313 : Henry VII of Luxembourg (1275 † 1313), crowned in 1312; Barry of ten argent and azure, a lion rampant gules crowned or.
		1314–1347 : Louis IV of Bavaria (1286 † 1347), crowned in 1328; Fusilly bendwise argent and azure.
		1348–1378 : Charles IV of Luxembourg (1316 † 1378), crowned in 1355; Gules a lion rampant argent, queue fourchée crossed in saltire, armed, langued, and crowned Or.
		1411–1437 : Sigismund of Luxembourg (1368 † 1437), crowned in 1433; Per pale, dexter barry of eight, gules and argent (for Hungary); sinister gules a lion rampant argent, queue fourchée crossed in saltire, armed, langued, and crowned Or (for Bohemia).
		1440–1493 : Frederick III of Habsburg (1415 † 1493), crowned in 1452; Gules a fess argent (Babenberg, adopted by Rudolph I (d.1291), King of Germany, of the House of Habsburg, having obtained the former Babenberg Duchies of Austria and Styria, in lieu of his paternal arms (Or, a lion rampant gules crowned armed and langued azure).
		1493–1519 : Maximilian I of Habsburg (1459 † 1519), crowned in 1508; Per pale, dexter gules a fess argent (for Austria); sinister bendy of six Or and azure, a bordure gules (for his wife Mary Duchess of Burgundy).
		1519–1556 : Charles V of Habsburg (1500 † 1558), crowned in 1519; Main article: Coat of arms of Charles V, Holy Roman Emperor Quarterly: I and IV grand-quarterly i and iv great-grand-quarterly 1 and 4 gules a three towered castle Or masoned sable and ajouré azure (for Castile), 2 and 3 argent a lion rampant purpure crowned Or langued and armed gules (for Leon), ii per pale, dexter per fess, in chief Or four pallets gules (for Aragon), in base gules a cross, saltire, and orle of chains linked together Or and a centre point vert (for Navarre), sinister argent a cross potent and four crosslets Or (for Jerusalem) impaling barry of eight gules and argent (for Hungary), iii per pale, dexter per fess, in chief Or four pallets gules (for Aragon), in base gules a cross, saltire, and orle of chains linked together Or and a centre point vert (for Navarre), sinister per saltire, 1 and 4 Or four pallets gules, 2 and 3 argent an eagle displayed sable (for Sicily); II and III grand-quarterly, i gules a fess argent (for Austria), ii azure semy-de-lis Or a bordure compony argent and gules (new Burgundy), iii bendy of six Or and azure a bordure gules (old Burgundy), iv sable a lion rampant Or langued and armed gules (for Brabant), overall at the fess point of the quarter an inescutcheon Or a lion rampant sable armed and langued gules (for Flanders) impaling argent an eagle displayed gules, armed, beaked, and langued Or (for Tyrol); enté en point argent a pomegranate proper seeded gules, supported, sculpted and slipped vert (for Granada).
		1558–1564 : Ferdinand I of Habsburg (1503 † 1564), Emperor; 1554–1576 : Maximilian II of Habsburg (1527 † 1576), Emperor; Quarterly, I and IV gules a lion rampant argent, queue fourchée crossed in saltire, armed, langued, and crowned Or (for Bohemia); II and III barry of eight, gules and argent (for Hungary); overall and inescutcheon per pale, dexter gules a fess argent (for Austria), sinister bendy of six Or and azure, a bordure gules (for Burgundy).
		1576–1611 : Rudolf II of Habsburg (1552 † 1612), Emperor; 1612–1619 : Matthias of Habsburg (1557 † 1619), Emperor; 1619–1637 : Ferdinand II of Habsburg (1578 † 1637), Emperor; Quarterly, I gules a lion rampant argent, queue fourchée crossed in saltire, armed, langued, and crowned Or (for Bohemia); II barry of eight, gules and argent (for Hungary); III per pale, dexter gules a fess argent (for Austria), sinister bendy of six Or and azure, a bordure gules (for Burgundy); IV grand-quarterly i and iv gules a three-towered castle Or ajouré azure (for Castile), ii and iii argent a lion rampant purpure armed, langued, and crowned Or (for Leon).
		1637–1657 : Ferdinand III of Habsburg (1608 † 1657), Emperor; 1653–1654 : Ferdinand IV of Habsburg (1633 † 1654); Quarterly, I gules a lion rampant argent, queue fourchée crossed in saltire, armed, langued, and crowned Or (for Bohemia); II barry of eight, gules and argent (for Hungary); III grand-quarterly, i and iv gules a three-towered castle Or (for Castile), ii and iii argent a lion rampant purpure armed, langued, and crowned Or (for Leon); IV per pale, dexter bendy of six Or and azure a bordure gules (for Burgundy), sinister per fess, chief argent an eagle displayed gules armed, langued, and beaked Or (for Tyrol), and base Or a lion rampant sable, armed and langued gules (for Flanders); overall an inescutcheon gules a fess argent (for Austria).
		1657–1705 : Leopold I of Habsburg (1640 † 1705), Emperor; Quarterly, I barry of eight, gules and argent (for Hungary); II gules a lion rampant argent, queue fourchée crossed in saltire, armed, langued, and crowned Or (for Bohemia); III per pale, dexter gules a fess argent (for Austria), sinister bendy of six Or and azure, a bordure gules (for Burgundy); IV grand-quarterly i and iv gules a three-towered castle Or ajouré azure (for Castile), ii and iii argent a lion rampant purpure armed, langued, and crowned Or (for Leon).
		1705–1711 : Joseph I of Habsburg (1678 † 1711), Emperor; Quarterly, I and IV gules a lion rampant argent, queue fourchée crossed in saltire, armed, langued, and crowned Or (for Bohemia); II and III barry of eight, gules and argent (for Hungary); overall and inescutcheon per pale, dexter gules a fess argent (for Austria), sinister bendy of six Or and azure, a bordure gules (for Burgundy).
		1711-1740 : Charles VI of Habsburg (1685 † 1740), Emperor; Quarterly, I gules a three-towered castle Or masoned sable and ajouré azure (for Castile); II barry of eight, gules and argent (for Hungary); III per pale, dexter Or four pallets gules (for Aragon), sinister per saltire i and iv Or four pallets gules, ii and iii argent an eagle displayed sable (for Sicily); IV per pale, dexter gules a fess argent (for Austria), sinister bendy of six Or and azure a bordure gules (for Burgundy); overall an inescutcheon gules a lion rampant argent, queue fourchée crossed in saltire, armed, langued, and crowned Or (for Bohemia).
		1742-1745 : Charles VII of Bavaria (1697 † 1745), Emperor; Quarterly, I and IV fusilly bendwise argent and azure (for Bavaria); II and III sable a lion rampant Or, armed, langued, and crowned gules (for the Electorate of the Palatinate); overall an inescutcheon gules an orb Or (for Arch-Steward of the Holy Roman Empire).
		1745-1765 : Francis I of Habsburg-Lorraine (1708 † 1765), Emperor; Quarterly, I barry of eight gules and argent (for Hungary) impaling azure semy-de-lis Or a label gules (for Naples); II argent a cross potent and four crosslets Or (for Jerusalem) impaling Or four pallets gules (for Aragon); III azure semy-de-lis Or a bordure gules (for the House of Valois-Anjou) impaling azure a lion sinister rampant Or, armed, langued, and crowned gules (for Guelders); IV Or a lion rampant sable, armed and langued gules (for Jülich) impaling azure crusilly fitchy, two barbels haurient addorsed Or (for Bar); overall an inescutcheon Or a bend gules three alerions argent (for Lorraine) impaling Or, in annulo six torteaux, the torteau in chief replaced by a roundel azure charged with three fleurs-de-lis Or (for the Medici family).
		1765-1790 : Joseph II of Habsburg-Lorraine (1741 † 1790), Emperor; Quarterly, I barry of eight, gules and argent, impaling gules a patriarchal cross argent on a trimount vert (for Hungary); II gules a lion rampant argent, queue fourchée crossed in saltire, armed, langued, and crowned Or (for Bohemia); III bendy of six Or and azure, a bordure gules (for Burgundy); IV Or, in annulo six torteaux, the torteau in chief replaced by a roundel azure charged with three fleurs-de-lis Or (for the Medici family); overall and inescutcheon gules a fess argent (for Austria) impaling Or a bend gules three alerions argent (for Lorraine).
		1790-1792 : Leopold II of Habsburg-Lorraine (1747 † 1792), King of Bohemia and Hungary, Emperor; 1792-1804 : Francis II of Habsburg-Lorraine (1768 † 1835), King of Bohemia and Hungary, Emperor of the Germans, Emperor of Austria; Quarterly, I barry of eight, gules and argent, impaling gules a patriarchal cross argent on a tri-mount vert (for Hungary); II gules a lion rampant argent, queue fourchée crossed in saltire, armed, langued, and crowned Or (for Bohemia); III bendy of six Or and azure, a bordure gules (for Burgundy); IV azure crusilly fitchy, two barbels haurient addorsed Or (for Bar); overall an inescutcheon per pale, dexter Or a bend gules three alerions argent (for Lorraine), sinister Or, in annulo six torteaux, the torteau in chief replaced by a roundel azure charged with three fleurs-de-lis Or (for the Medici family), overall on a pale gules a fess argent (for Austria).

== High offices (Reichserzämter) ==
Arms	Office and Blazon
	Arch-Chamberlain of the Holy Roman Empire: Azure a sceptre Or.; Azure two sceptres in saltire Or.
	Arch-Steward of the Holy Roman Empire Gules, an orb Or.
	Arch-Treasurer of the Holy Roman Empire Gules, the imperial crown proper.
	Arch-Marshal of the Holy Roman Empire Per fess sable and argent, two swords in saltire gules.

== Prince-electors ==
The seven Electors named in the Golden Bull of 1356 were: the Prince-Bishops of Cologne, Mainz and Trier, the King of Bohemia, the Count Palatine of the Rhine, the Duke of Saxony and the Margrave of Brandenburg.

The Count Palatine was replaced by the Duke of Bavaria in 1623, as the Elector Palatine, Frederick V, came under the imperial ban after participating in the Bohemian Revolt. The Count Palatine was granted a new electorate in 1648. Saxony was held by a Protestant elector from 1525 (John), the Palatinate from 1541 (Otto Henry). In 1685, a Catholic branch of the Wittelsbach family inherited the Palatinate and a new Protestant electorate was created in 1692 for the Duke of Brunswick-Lüneburg, who became known as the Elector of Hanover (officially confirmed by the Imperial Diet in 1708). The Elector of Saxony (Augustus II) converted to Catholicism in 1697 so that he could become King of Poland, but no additional Protestant electors were created, and the Electorate itself remained officially Protestant.

=== Spiritual Electors ===
Arms	Electorate/Blazon
	Cologne Argent a cross sable.
	Mainz Gules, a wheel with six spokes argent.
	Trier Argent a cross gules.

=== Secular Electors ===
Arms	Electorate/Blazon
	Bohemia Gules a lion rampant argent, queue fourchée crossed in saltire, armed, langued, and crowned Or.
	Electorate of the Palatinate (suspended 1623–1648): Before 1623: Sable a lion rampant Or crowned gules.; From 1648 (Charles I Louis): Quarterly, I and IV fusilly bendwise argent and azure (for Bavaria); II and III sable a lion rampant Or, armed, langued, and crowned gules.
	Brandenburg Argent an eagle displayed gules crowned Or.
	Saxony Barry sable and Or, a crancelin vert.
	Bavaria (from 1623) Fusilly bendwise argent and azure.
	Brunswick-Lüneburg (Hanover) (from 1692) Per pale, I Gules two lions passant guardant Or (for Brunswick), II Or a semy of hearts Gules a lion rampant Azure (for Lüneburg).: After 1714: Laid on Royal coat of arms of the United Kingdom.

== Other states ==
Entries are listed by Imperial Circle (introduced 1500, 1512) even for territories that ceased to exist prior to 1500.

=== Austrian Circle ===
Arms	Location/Blazon
	Archduchy of Austria Gules a fess Argent.
	Duchy of Carinthia Or three lions passant Sable armed and langued Gules impaling Gules a fess Argent.
	Duchy of Carniola Argent an eagle displayed Azure, crowned of the Imperial Crown Proper, armed, beaked, and langued Gules, charged with a crescent chequy Gules and Or.
	Patria del Friuli Azure an eagle displayed Or, armed, langued and beaked Gules, the wings charged with a trefoil Gules.
	Duchy of Styria Vert, a panther rampant Argent incensed proper.
	County of Tyrol Argent an eagle displayed Gules, armed, beaked, and langued Or, the wings charged with a trefoil Or.

=== Bavarian Circle ===
Arms	Location/Blazon
	Bavaria: Simple form: Fusily bendwise, Azure and Argent.; Electorate, from 1753: Quarterly: fusily bendwise Azure and Argent; and Sable, a lion rampant Or, armed and langued Gules (for the Electorate of the Palatinate); overall an inescutcheon: Gules, an orb Or.
	Haag Gules, a horse springing Argent, bridled Argent.
	Leuchtenberg Quarterly: I and IV Gules, an oak branch with acorns Or; II and III Or, a hops branch Vert; an inescutcheon argent a fess Azure.
	Ortenburg Gules, a bend embattled-counter-embattled Argent.
	Prince-bishopric of Passau Argent a wolf rampant Gules.
	Prince-bishopric of Regensburg Gules, two keys in saltire argent.
	Prince-archbishopric of Salzburg Party per pale: Or a lion rampant Sable, armed and langued Gules; and Gules a fess Argent.

=== Burgundian Circle ===
Arms	Location/Blazon
	County of Burgundy: Before 1280: Gules an eagle displayed argent.; After 1280: Azure billetty Or a lion rampant crowned Or, armed and langued Gules.
	Brabant: Before 1288: Sable a lion rampant Or, armed and langued Gules.; From 1288 to 1406: Quarterly, I and IV Sable a lion rampant Or, armed and langued Gules; II and III Argent a lion rampant Gules, queue fourchée, armed and langued Or.; From 1406 to 1430: Quarterly, I and IV Azure three fleur-de-lis Or, a bordure compony Argent and Gules; II Sable a lion rampant Or, armed and langued Gules; III Argent a lion rampant Gules, queue fourchée, armed and langued Or.
	Flanders Or a lion rampant Sable, armed and langued Gules.
	Guelders: Before 1236: Or three cinquefoils Gules.; From 1236 to 1276: Azure billetty Or a lion rampant Or.; From 1276 to 1378: Azure a lion rampant Or, queue fourchée, armed and langued Gules, crowned Or.; After 1378: Azure a lion sinister rampant Or, queue fourchée, armed and langued Gules, crowned Or, impaling Or a lion rampant sable, armed and langued gules.
	County of Hainaut: Before 1299: Chevronny Or and Sable.; From 1299 to 1254: Quarterly, I and IV Or a lion rampant Sable, armed and langued Gules; II and III Or a lion rampant Gules, armed and langued Azure.; From 1254 to 1433: Quarterly, I and IV fusilly bendwise Argent and Azure; II and III grand-quarterly I and IV Or a lion rampant Sable, armed and langued Gules; II and III Or a lion rampant Gules, armed and langued Azure.
	Holland Or a lion rampant gules, armed and langued azure.
	Duchy of Limburg: Before 1214: Argent a lion rampant Gules, armed and langued Or.; After 1214: Argent a lion rampant Gules, queue fourchée, armed, langued, and crowned Or.
	County of Loon (County of Chiny): Counts of Loon: Barry of ten, Or and Gules.; Counts of Chiny: Gules crusily fitchy, two barbels haurient addorsed Or.; Counts of Loon and Chiny: Barry of ten Or and Gules, impaling Gules crusily fitchy, two barbels haurient addorsed Or.; Counts of Loon and Chiny of the Heinsberg dynasty: Quarterly, I and IV Gules a lion rampant Argent, queue fourchée crossed in saltire; II and III barry of ten Or and Gules impaling Gules crusily fitchy two barbels haurient addorsed Or.; Counts of Loon and Chiny of the Montferrat-Oreye dynasty: Quarterly, I and IV Argent a lion rampant sable; II and III barry of ten Or and Gules impaling Gules crusily fitchy two barbels haurient addorsed Or.
	Duchy of Luxembourg: Until 1282 and after 1288: Barry of ten Argent and Azure, a lion rampant Gules, armed, langued, and crowned Or.; From 1282 to 1288: Barry of ten Argent and Azure, a lion rampant queue fourchée crossed in saltire gules, armed, langued, and crowned Or.; Main article: Coat of arms of Luxembourg
	County of Namur Or, a lion rampant Sable, armed and langued Gules, a bend overall of the same.

=== Franconian Circle ===
Arms	Location/Blazon
	Prince-bishopric of Bamberg Or, a lion rampant Sable armed and langued Gules, overall a bendlet Argent.
	County of Castell Quarterly, Argent and Gules.
	County of Erbach Party per fess Gules and Argent, three mullets of six counterchanged.
	County of Hohenlohe Argent, two lions passant guardant coward Sable, langued Gules.
	County of Löwenstein-Wertheim Party per fess: fusily Argent and Azure; and Or, a lion statant Gules, atop a mount Azure.
	City of Nuremberg Or, a double-headed eagle Sable, armed and beaked Or, langued Gules, dimidiating bendy Gules and Argent.
	County of Rieneck Quarterly: chevrony Or and Gules; and barry Or and Gules; overall a Wheel of Mainz Proper.
	Rothenburg ob der Tauber Argent, a double-towered castle Gules.
	Schwarzenberg Quarterly: paley Azure and Argent; and Or, a raven collared Or pecking the eye out of a Turk's head couped at the neck Proper.
	Schweinfurt Azure an eagle displayed Argent.
	Seinsheim Argent, three pallets azure, overall a bend sinister wavy Or.
	Weißenburg im Nordgau Gules, a two-towered castle portcullised Argent, with an escutcheon of Or, a double-headed eagle sable at the honour point.
	Welzheim Argent, a pine tree on a mount Vert.
	County of Wertheim Party per fess: Or, a demi-eagle displayed Sable, langued and beaked Gules; and Azure three roses Argent.
	Wiesentheid Gules, a lion passant sinister crowned Or on a mount Vert; issuant from base three stems of grass surtout Proper.
	Windsheim Argent, an eagle displayed Sable, armed and langued Or, with a W Or on the breast.
	Prince-bishopric of Würzburg Argent a Celtic cross Sable; a chief dancetty Gules (de).

=== Lower Rhenish-Westphalian Circle ===
Arms	Location/Blazon
	County of Nassau Azure, billetty or, a lion rampant of the last armed and langued gules.
	Duchy of Cleves: Cleves dynasty: Gules, an escutcheon Argent, overall an escarbuncle Or.; Mark dynasty: Quarterly, I and IV gules an escutcheon Argent, overall an escarbuncle Or; II and III Or a fess chequy Argent and Gules.
	Berg Argent a lion rampant Gules, queue fourchée crossed in saltire, armed, langued, and crowned Or.
	Duchy of Jülich Or a lion rampant sable, armed and langued gules.
	Prince-Bishopric of Liège Quarterly: I: gules a fess argent; II: Argent, three lions rampant Vert, crowned Or, armed and langued Gules; III: Barry Gules and Or; IV: Or, three hunting horns Gules, hooped and belted Argent. Overall an inescutcheon Gules, a perron, supported by three lions, surmounted by a pineapple and a cross pattée, with the letters L to the dexter and G to the sinister, all Or.
	County of Mark: Counts of Mark: Or a fess chequy Gules and Argent.; Counts of Cleves and Mark: Quarterly, I and IV Gules an escutcheon Argent, overall an escarbuncle Or; II and III Or a fess chequy Gules and Argent.
	County of Ravensberg Argent three chevrons Gules.

=== Upper Rhenish Circle ===
Arms	Location/Blazon
	Landgraviate of Hesse Azure a lion rampant barry Argent and Gules, armed and crowned Or.
	Lorraine: Before 1430: Or a bend Gules, three alerions bendwise displayed Argent.; From 1430 to 1473: Quarterly of six, I barry of eight Gules and Argent (for Hungary); II Azure semy-de-lis Or a label Gules (for Naples); III Argent a cross potent between four crosslets Or (for Jerusalem); IV Azure semy-de-lis Or a bordure Gules (for the House of Valois-Anjou); V Azure crusilly fitchy, two barbels haurient addorsed Or (for Bar); VI Or a bend Gules, three alerions bendwise displayed Argent (for Lorraine); overall an inescutcheon Or four pallets Gules (for Aragon).; From 1473 to 1508: Quarterly: I barry of eight Gules and Argent impaling Azure semy-de-lis Or a label Gules; II Argent a cross potent between four crosslets Or impaling Or four pallets Gules; III Azure semy-de-lis Or a bordure Gules; IV Azure crusilly fitchy, two barbels haurient addorsed Or; overall an inescutcheon Or a bend Gules three alerions bendwise displayed Argent.; From 1538 to 1737: Quarterly: I barry of eight Gules and Argent impaling Azure semy-de-lis Or a label Gules; II Argent a cross potent between four crosslets Or impaling Or four pallets Gules; III Azure semy-de-lis Or a bordure Gules impaling azure a lion sinister rampant Or, armed, langued, and crowned Gules (for Guelders); IV Or a lion rampant Sable, armed and langued Gules (for Jülich) impaling azure crusilly fitchy, two barbels haurient addorsed Or; overall an inescutcheon Or a bend Gules, three alerions bendwise displayed Argent.
	Duchy of Savoy Gules a cross argent.
	Vaudémont: Before 1346: Barry of ten, Argent and Sable.; From 1346 to 1386: Azure three broyes fesswise Or linked Argent, in chief Argent a lion issuant Gules.; From 1386 to 1473: Or, on a bend Gules, three alerions bendwise displayed Argent; overall a label azure.

=== Electoral Rhenish Circle ===
Arms	Location/Blazon
	Arenberg Gules, three cinquefoils Or; on a chief Or, three torteaux.
	Beilstein Gules, a hunting horn argent, bound Or.
	Prince-archbishopric of Cologne Argent a cross sable.
	Lower Isenburg Argent two bars sable.
	Prince-archbishopric of Mainz Gules, a wheel argent. (Or: Gules, the Wheel of Mainz Argent.)
	Electorate of the Palatinate: Before 1214: Sable a lion rampant Or crowned Gules.; After 1214: Quarterly, I and IV fusilly bendwise Argent and Azure (for Bavaria); II and III sable a lion rampant Or, armed, langued, and crowned Gules.
	Thurn und Taxis Quarterly: Argent, two sceptres in saltire, tipped with fleurs-de-lys Azure, surmounted by a tower Gules ajouré Azure; Or a lion Gules, crowned, armed and langued Azure; overall an inescutcheon Azure, a badger Proper.
	Prince-archbishopric of Trier Argent a cross Gules.

=== Lower Saxon Circle ===
Arms	Location
	Holstein Gules, a nettle leaf Argent.

=== Upper Saxon Circle ===
Arms	Location/Blazon
	Margraviate of Brandenburg Argent an eagle displayed Gules crowned with an electoral hat Proper, armed and beaked Or, langued Gules, the wings charged with a trefoil Or, in his dexter claw grasping a sceptre Or tipped Gules thereupon an eagle displayed Argent, armed, langued, beaked and crowned Or, on his chest a torteux Gules, in his dexter claw grasping a sceptre and orb Or and in his sinister claw grasping a sword Or; and in his sinister claw graping a sword Argent hilted Or; overall and on his chest an inescutcheon Azure, a sceptre finished with a fleur-de-lys Or.
	Duchy of Pomerania Quarterly of nine; I Azure a griffin segreant sinister Gules armed and beaked Or (for Pomerania-Stettin); II Argent a griffin segreant Gules armed and beaked Or (for Pomerania); III Or a griffin segreant Sable armed, langued and beaked Gules (for Cassubia); IV Argent a griffin segreant sinister bendy Vert and Gules (for Wenden); V Or a demi-lion Sable, crowned, langued and armed Gules issuant from a wall of bricks throughout Azure therein a chevron of bricks Gules (for Rügen); VI Gules a sea-griffin segreant Argent, armed, beaked and langued Or (for Usedom); VII Gules a griffin segreant sinister Sable, armed, langued and beaked Gules, under his wings, feathers of Argent (for Pomerania-Barth); VIII Or two batons in saltire Gules between four roses Gules barbed and seeded Or; IX a demi-griffin segreant Argent, armed, langued and beaked Or issuant from a wall of bricks alternately Azure and Or (for Pomerania-Wolgast.)
	Duchy of Saxony Barry Sable and Or, overall a crancelin Vert.

=== Swabian Circle ===
Arms	Location/Blazon
	Augsburg Party per pale Gules and Argent, a chapiter Or thereupon a cedar cone Vert.
	Baden Or a bend Gules.

=== Lands of the Bohemian Crown ===
Arms	Location/Blazon
	Kingdom of Bohemia Argent, a lion rampant queue forchée, armed, langued and crowned Or.
	Margraviate of Moravia Azure an eagle displayed chequy Argent and Gules, armed, langued, beaked and crowned Or.
	Görlitz Party per fess, chief gules a lion rampant Argent, armed, langued, and crowned Or; base Argent.
	Lusatia: Lower Lusatia: Argent, a bull passant reguardant Gules, horned and hooved Or.; Upper Lusatia: Per fess embattled, Azure and Or.
	Silesia: Upper Silesia: Azure, an eagle displayed Or.; Lower Silesia: Or, an eagle displayed Sable, armed and beaked Or and langued Gules, crowned with a Princely hat Proper charged on the breast with a crescent terminating issuing from the centrepoint a cross patée argent.

=== Other ===
Arms	Location/Blazon
	Geneva (before 1401) Or a cross quarter-pierced Azure.
	Nice (as part of the Duchy of Savoy from 1046) Argent, in base wavy of Azure and Argent issuing therefrom three rocks Vert thereupon an eagle displayed crowned Gules.
	Provence (before 1481): Before 1245: Or four pallets gules.; After 1245: Azure semy-de-lis Or, a label gules.
	Prussia (after 1701) Argent, an eagle displayed sable crowned with the Royal Crown Proper, the wings charged with a trefoil Or, in his dexter claw grasping a sceptre Or tipped Gules thereupon an eagle displayed Argent, armed, langued, beaked and crowned Or, on his chest a torteux Gules, in his dexter claw grasping a sceptre Or and in his sinister claw grasping a sword Or on his chest an R Or. Main article: Coat of arms of Prussia
	Teutonic Knights (1224–1525): Argent, a cross sable.; Grand Master: Argent, on a cross Sable a cross floretty Or and overall on an inescutcheon Or an eagle displayed sable, armed, langued and beaked Gules, the wings charged with a trefoil Gules.
	Viennois (before 1349) Or, a dolphin haurient azure finned Gules.

== See also ==
- Flags of the Holy Roman Empire
- Coat of arms of Germany
