= Reichsadler =

Heraldic eagle used in Germany and Austria

- Reichsadler (Holy Roman Empire)

Versions
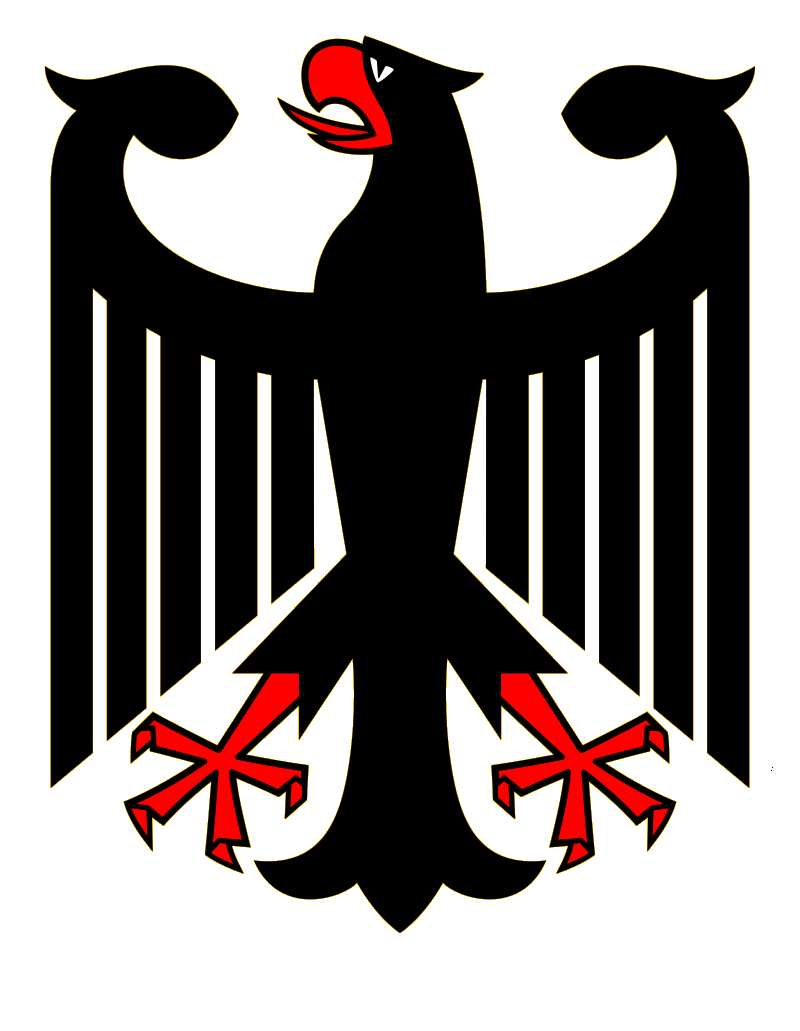
- Bundesadler (Germany)

- Bundesadler (Austria)

The Reichsadler (German pronunciation: [ˈʁaɪ̯çsˌʔaːdlɐ], "Imperial Eagle") is the heraldic eagle, derived from the Roman eagle standard, used by the Holy Roman Emperors, later by the Emperors of Austria and in modern coat of arms of Austria and Germany. The term is also translated as "Reich's Eagle."

== Origin and meaning ==
Like some other European heraldic eagles, the Reichsadler is derived from the Roman standards, the Aquila. In this tradition, it refers to sovereign command as such, the empire, and not to the person or dynasty of the ruler, since Caesar, the Roman Empire did not use the eagle as a personal or dynastic emblem. However, the double-headed eagle has been widespread as a dynastic symbol in Asia Minor since the 4th century. The later ruling dynasties of the Eastern Roman Empire used both the eagle and the double-headed eagle for this purpose. Presumably, from a pre-medieval, Eastern Roman perspective, the eagle did not represent a territorial symbol, but rather a symbol of a ruling dynasty. According to medieval heraldic interpretation, however, the eagle primarily represents a territory and the sovereign authority over it. Following the iconography of the Eastern Roman emperors, the eagle, initially with one head, later generally with two heads, became the emblem of imperial dignity and status, of the emperorship, throughout Europe. Identification with the dynasties themselves is less common and only reappears prominently in the Austrian Empire.

The Frankish kingdom adopted, along with other ancient symbols, the Roman eagle as a symbol of power in order to legitimize its connection to the Roman Empire and to present the Frankish emperorship as a direct continuation of the Roman Empire. This translatio imperii is expressed in the (now lost) eagle on Charlemagne's Aachen palace, as well as in the Roman eagle on the ancient cameo, which was incorporated into the center of the Lothair Cross around the year 1000, likely on the orders of Emperor Otto III. Due to its establishment as a Carolingian symbol of sovereignty, the imperial eagle falls within the context of the Carolingian Renaissance and its diverse efforts to connect, in form and spirit, with late antiquity and its Roman Empire. Later, the emperors of the Holy Roman Empire also embraced this tradition, particularly Otto III, whose corresponding endeavors are described as restauratio imperii.

== History ==
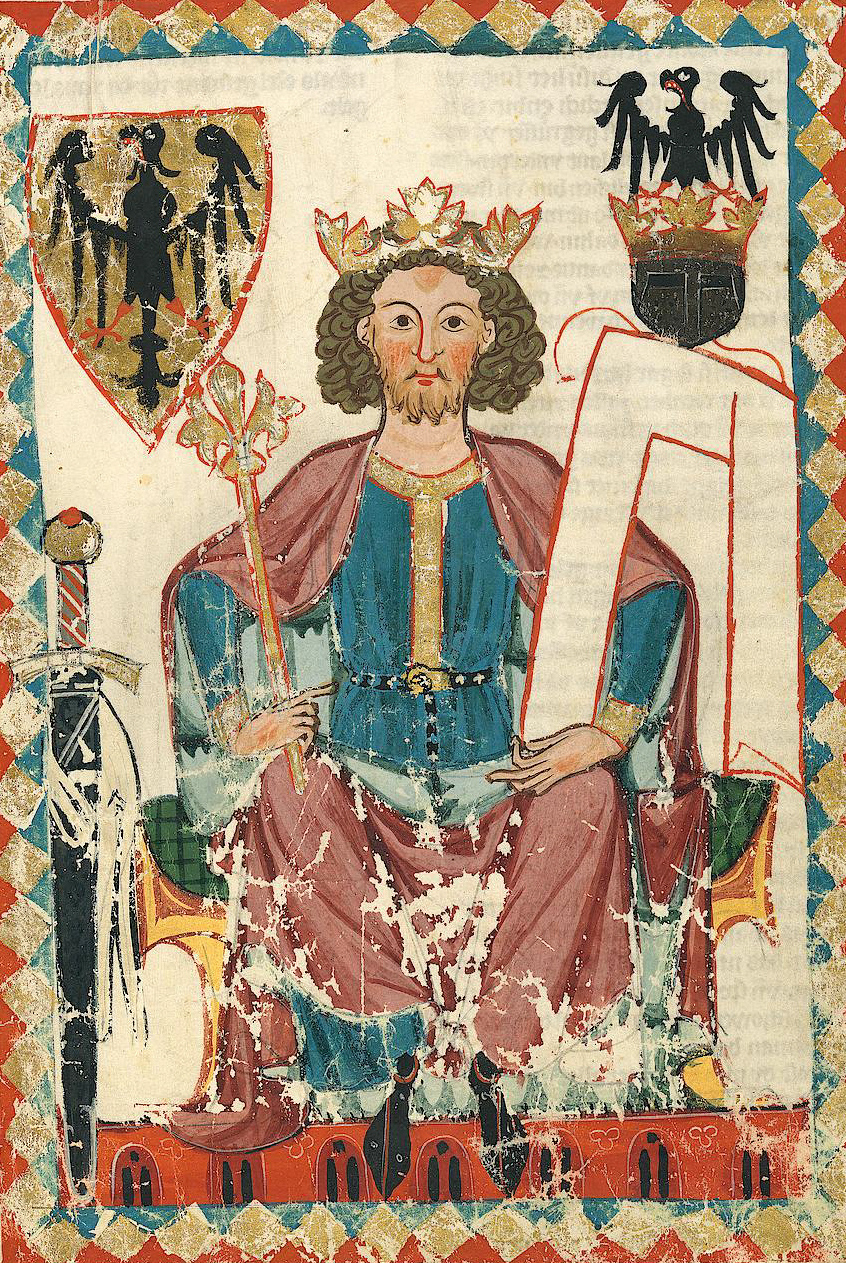
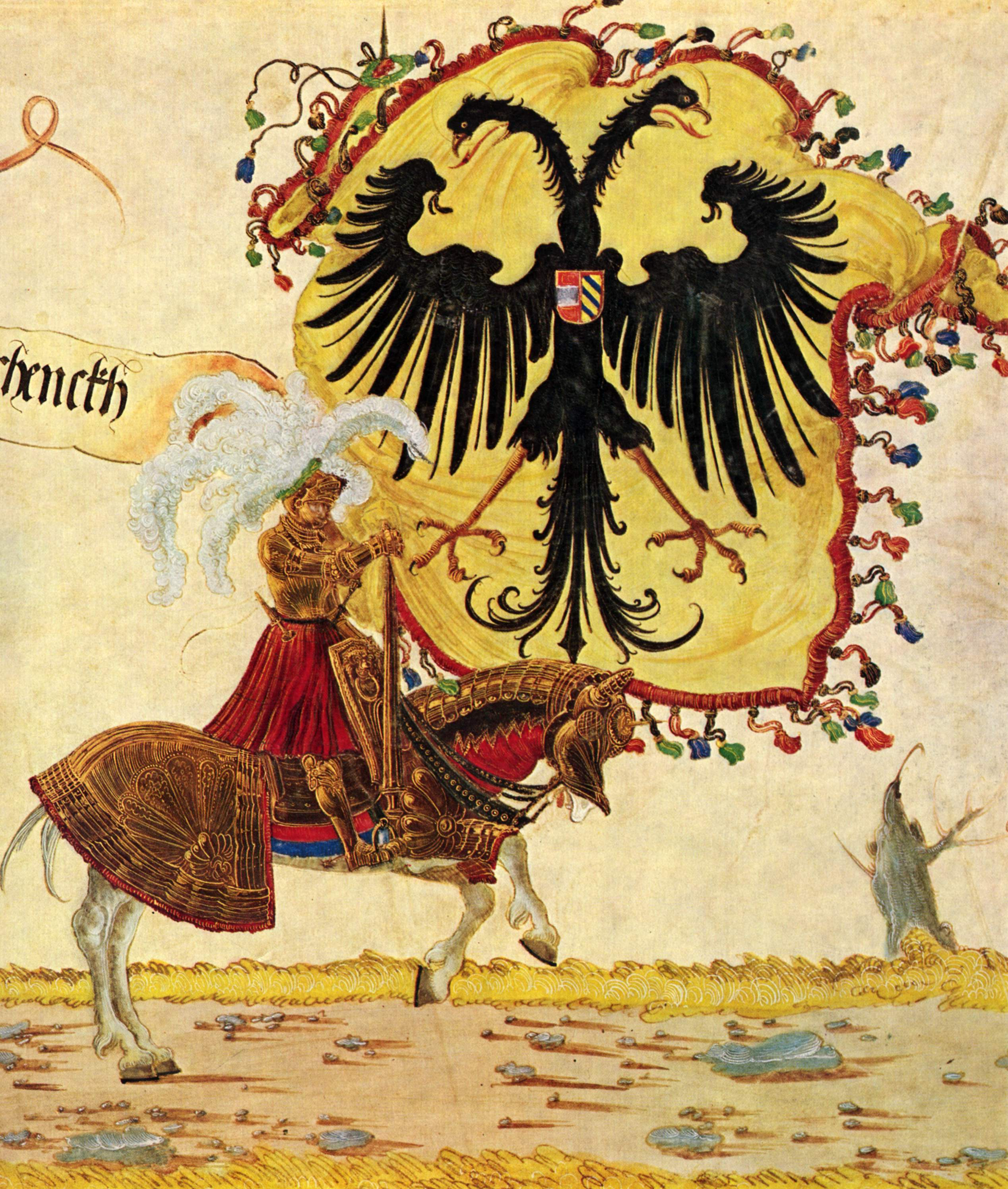
Left: Emperor Henry VI (Hadlaub, Codex Manesse, about 1300), original single-headed eagle. Right: Emperor Maximilian with the Imperial Banner (Albrecht Altdorfer, c. 1515), double-headed eagle with haloes.

=== Holy Roman Empire ===
The Reichsadler, i.e. the German Imperial Eagle, originated from a proto-heraldic emblem that was believed to have been used by Charlemagne, the first Frankish ruler, whom the Pope crowned as Holy Roman Emperor in AD 800, and derived ultimately from the Aquila, i.e. eagle standard, of the ancient Roman army.

An eagle statue was erected on the roof of the Carolingian palace, and an eagle was placed on the orb of Emperor Otto III. Emperor Frederick Barbarossa popularised use of the eagle as the Imperial emblem by using it in all his banners, coats of arms, coins, and insignia. An eagle pattern was also placed on the Bust of Charlemagne.

The Ottonian and Salian Emperors had themselves depicted with the Roman "eagle sceptre", and Emperor Frederick II depicted the Imperial Eagle on his coins. Before the mid-13th century, however, the Imperial Eagle was an Imperial symbol in its own right, and not used yet as a heraldic charge in a coat of arms.

An early depiction of a double-headed Imperial Eagle in a heraldic shield, attributed to Frederick II of Hohenstaufen, is found in the Chronica Majora by Matthew Paris (circa 1250). Segar's Roll (circa 1280) likewise depicts the double-headed Imperial Eagle as the coat of arms of the King of Germany.

The Imperial Eagle also is depicted in the seals of free Imperial cities, including that of Kaiserswerth in the 13th century, Lübeck in the 14th century, Besançon (1290), Cheb (1277), and others.

Use of the Imperial Eagle in the Imperial coat of arms of a reigning emperor dates to after the interregnum. Sigismund of Luxembourg used a black double-headed Imperial Eagle after he was crowned as Holy Roman Emperor in 1433; thereafter the single-headed Imperial Eagle represented the title of King of the Romans and the double-headed one the title of Emperor. During the following century, Albert II of Germany was the final King-Elect of Germany who did not progress to coronation as Emperor. After the German Reformation, beginning with Ferdinand I (1558), the Holy Roman Emperors ceased to be crowned by the Pope.

The Teutonic Order under Hermann von Salza had the privilege of displaying the Imperial Eagle in its coat of arms, which privilege Emperor Frederick II granted it. The black Imperial Eagle was later adopted when the Teutonic State was transformed into the Duchy of Prussia in 1525, and a modified version was used in the arms of Royal Prussia (1466–1772).

=== Austria ===
In 1804, Holy Roman Emperor Francis II established the Austrian Empire from the lands of the Habsburg monarchy, and adopted the double-headed eagle, aggrandized by an inescutcheon emblem of the House of Habsburg-Lorraine and the Order of the Golden Fleece, as its coat of arms; the Holy Roman Empire was subsequently dissolved in 1806. Austria-Hungary later used the double headed eagle in its coat of arms to represent Austrian influence and dominance of the Empire, the arms was used from 1867 until 1918.

Since 1919 the coat of arms of Austria has depicted a single-headed eagle with a shield carrying the Austrian tricolor (red-white-red) and the eagle is carrying a hammer and sickle, they represent the workerers and farmers (not communism) and wears a crown to represent the middle class. Although not a national symbol in the modern sense, the Reichsadler evoked sentiments of loyalty to the empire. The Federal State of Austria was a continuation of the First Austrian Republic between 1934 and 1938 when it was a one-party state led by the conservative, nationalist, corporatist, clerical fascist and Catholic Fatherland Front. The Federal State did use a double headed eagle to emphasize the history of Austrian dominance (and the empire) of Europe. After the end of World War II in 1945, the Second Austrian Republic adopted the same single-headed eagle as the First Austrian Republic, with broken chains added to symbolise the end of fascism.

=== Germany ===
The Reichsadler was used for the first time again as a symbol for the German territory (without Austria) during the revolutions of 1848 in the German states, the Reichsadler was restored as a symbol of national unity: it became the coat of arms of the short-lived German Empire and subsequently the German Confederation from its restoration in 1850 until its dissolution in 1866.

In 1871 the German Empire used a single-headed eagle with a Prussian inescutcheon the single head was used to represent the so-called Kleindeutschland. The design of the eagle was altered at least twice during the German Empire. It shows the imperial eagle, a comparatively realistic black eagle, with the heraldic crown of the German Empire. The eagle has a red beak, tongue and claws, with open wings and feathers. In contrast to its predecessor, the eagle of the German Confederation, it has only one head, looking to the right, symbolising that important parts of the old empire, Austria and Bohemia, were not part of this new empire. The (single-headed eagle) was used until 1918.

After World War I with the introduction of the Weimar Republic, the coat of arms of Germany was also altered accounting for the political changes. The Weimar Republic (1918–1933), retained the Reichsadler without the symbols of the former Monarchy (Crown, Collar, Breast shield with the Prussian Arms). This left the black eagle with one head, facing to the right, with open wings but closed feathers, with a red beak, tongue and claws and white highlighting.

In Nazi Germany, a stylised eagle combined with the Nazi swastika was made the national emblem (Hoheitszeichen) by order of Adolf Hitler in 1935. Despite its medieval origin, the term "Reichsadler" in common English understanding is mostly associated with this specific Nazi-era version. The Nazi Party had used a very similar symbol for itself, called the Parteiadler ("Party's eagle"). These two insignia can be distinguished as the Reichsadler looks to its right shoulder whereas the Parteiadler looks to its left shoulder.

Later after World War II, West Germany reinstalled the single headed eagle as its coat of arms (Bundesadler). East Germany decided not to use an eagle as its national symbol, but rather a more socialist-style emblem. The emblem featured a hammer and compass surrounded by a ring of wheat. The hammer and compass were the emblem of East Germany until its dissolution as part of the German reunification in 1990.

== Gallery ==
=== Holy Roman Empire ===
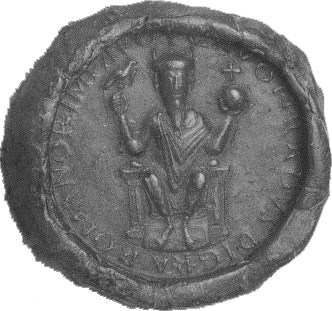
Seal of Conrad II (1029), with a depiction of the eagle-sceptre

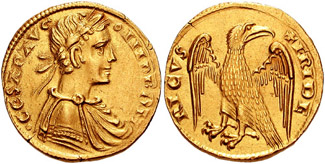
Imperial eagle on a coin of Frederick II (r. 1197–1250)

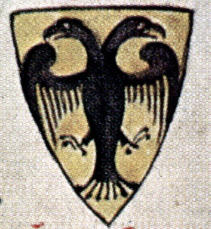
Arms of Otto IV as shown in Chronica Maiora (c. 1250), early depiction of a double-headed Reichsadler

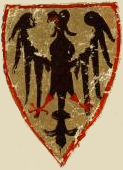
Imperial coat of arms attributed to Henry VI (r. 1191–1197) from Codex Manesse (c. 1304)

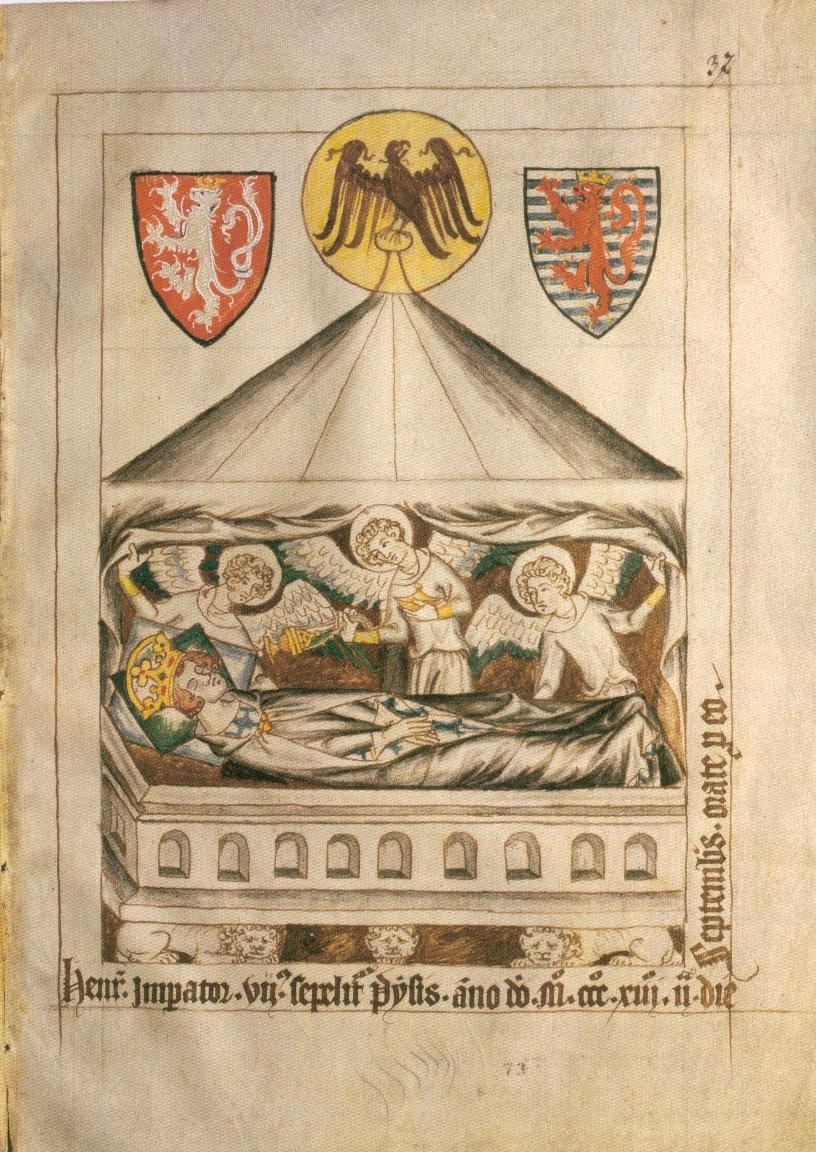
Tomb of Henry VII (d. 1313), with the emperor's coats of arms and the imperial eagle (Codex Balduini Trevirorum, c. 1340)

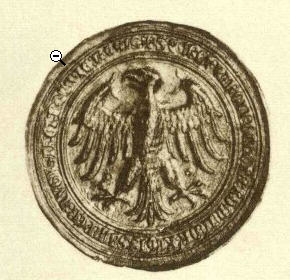
Imperial eagle in a seal used by Charles IV in 1349

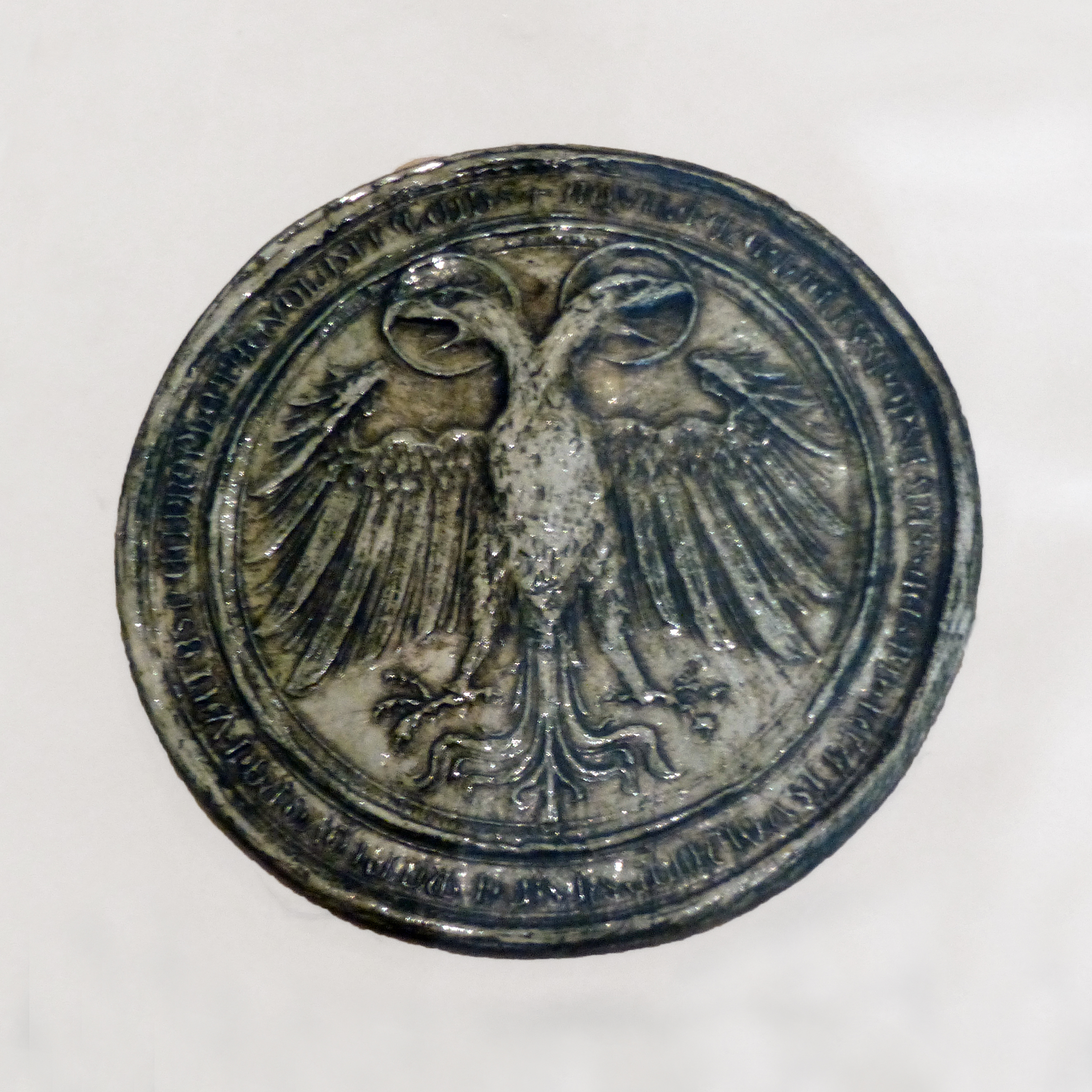
Double-headed imperial eagle in the seal used by Sigismund of Luxembourg in 1433

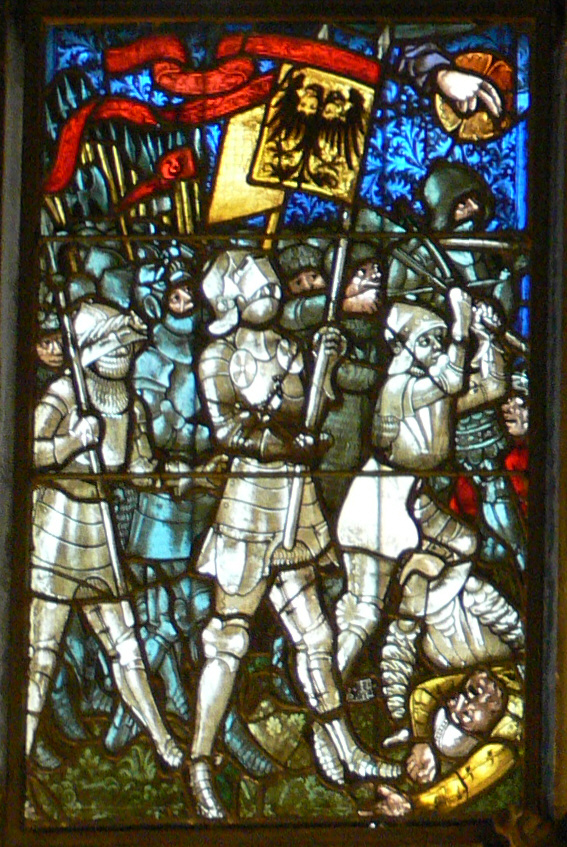
The Reichssturmfahne in a stained glass window in Bern Minster, c. 1450

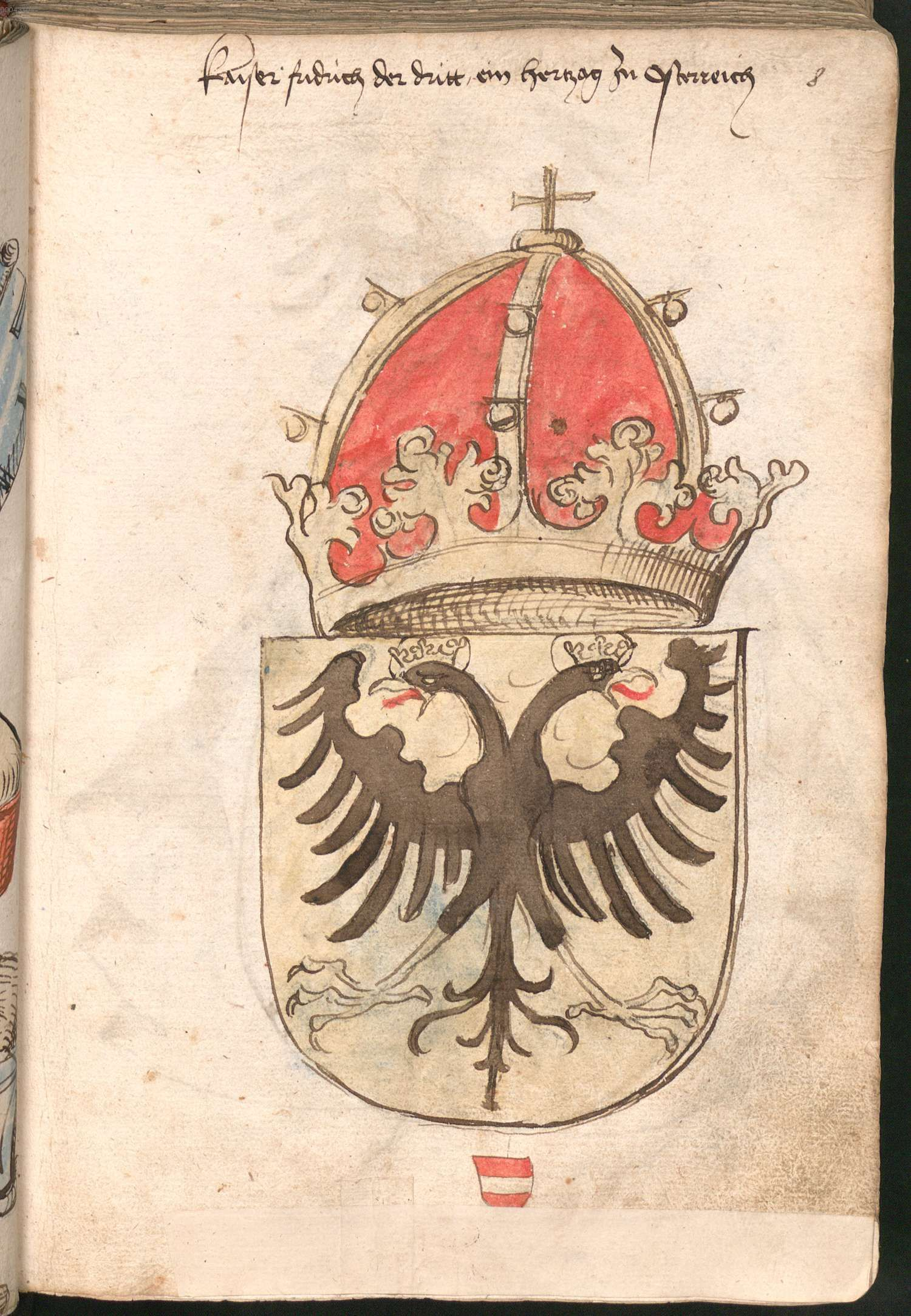
Imperial coat of arms of Frederick III (r. 1452–1493) in the Wernigerode Armorial (c. 1490)

Quaternion Eagle c. 1510, the eagle displaying the imperial quaternions on its remiges.

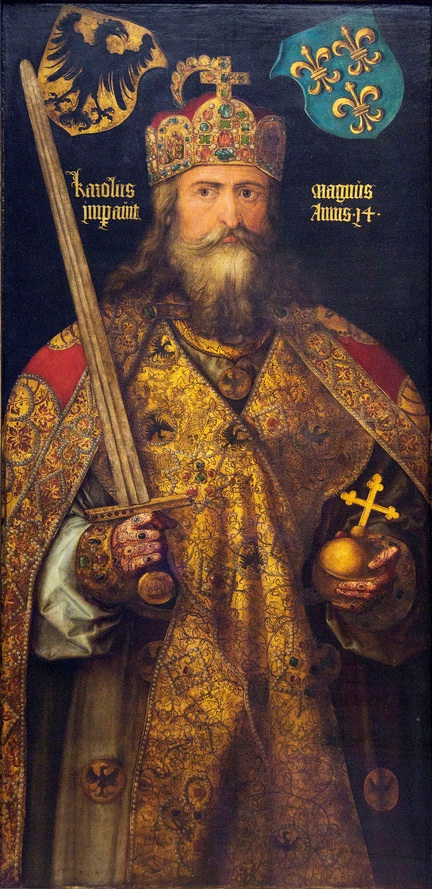
The imperial eagle depicted in Emperor Charlemagne by Albrecht Dürer, c. 1512

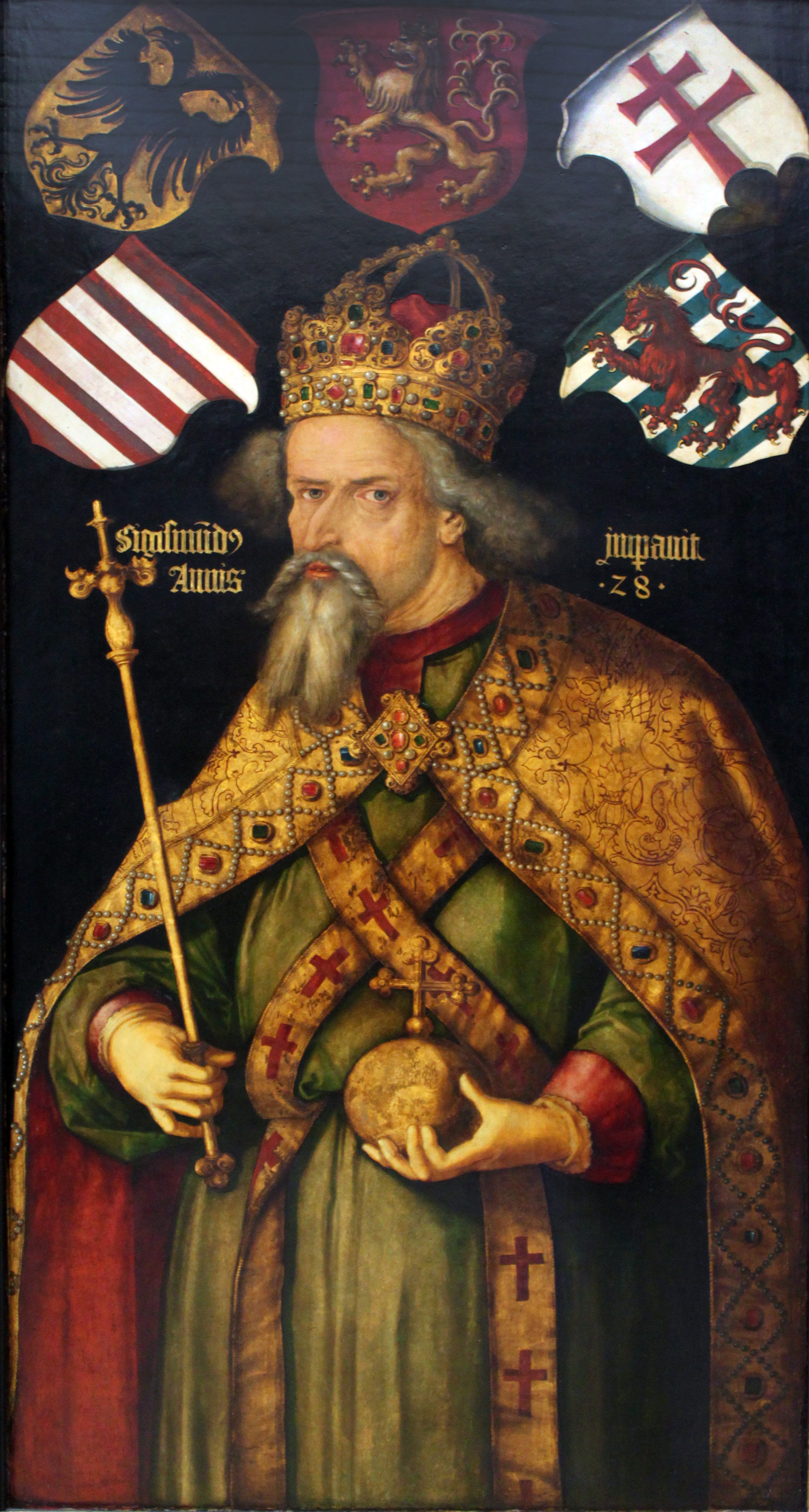
The imperial eagle depicted in Emperor Sigismund by Albrecht Dürer, c. 1512

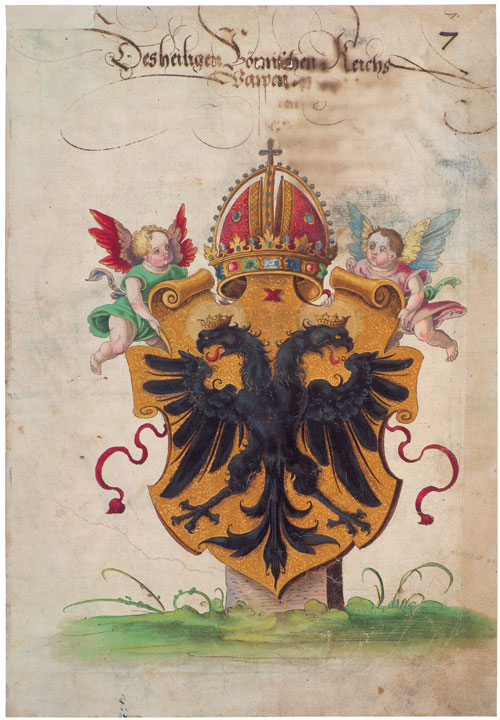
Imperial arms by Virgil Solis (c. 1540)

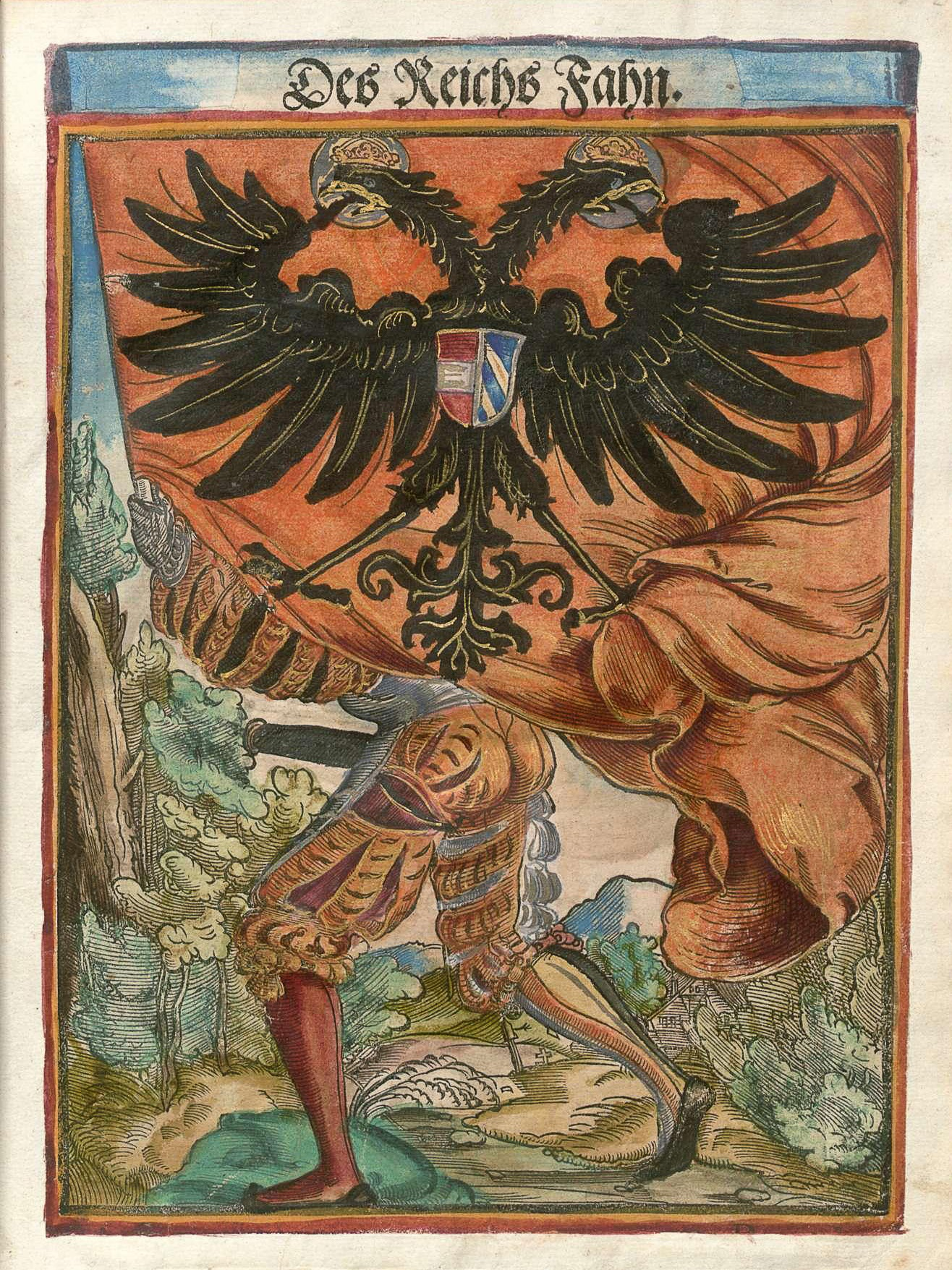
Depiction of the Reichssturmfahne in a 1545 woodcut

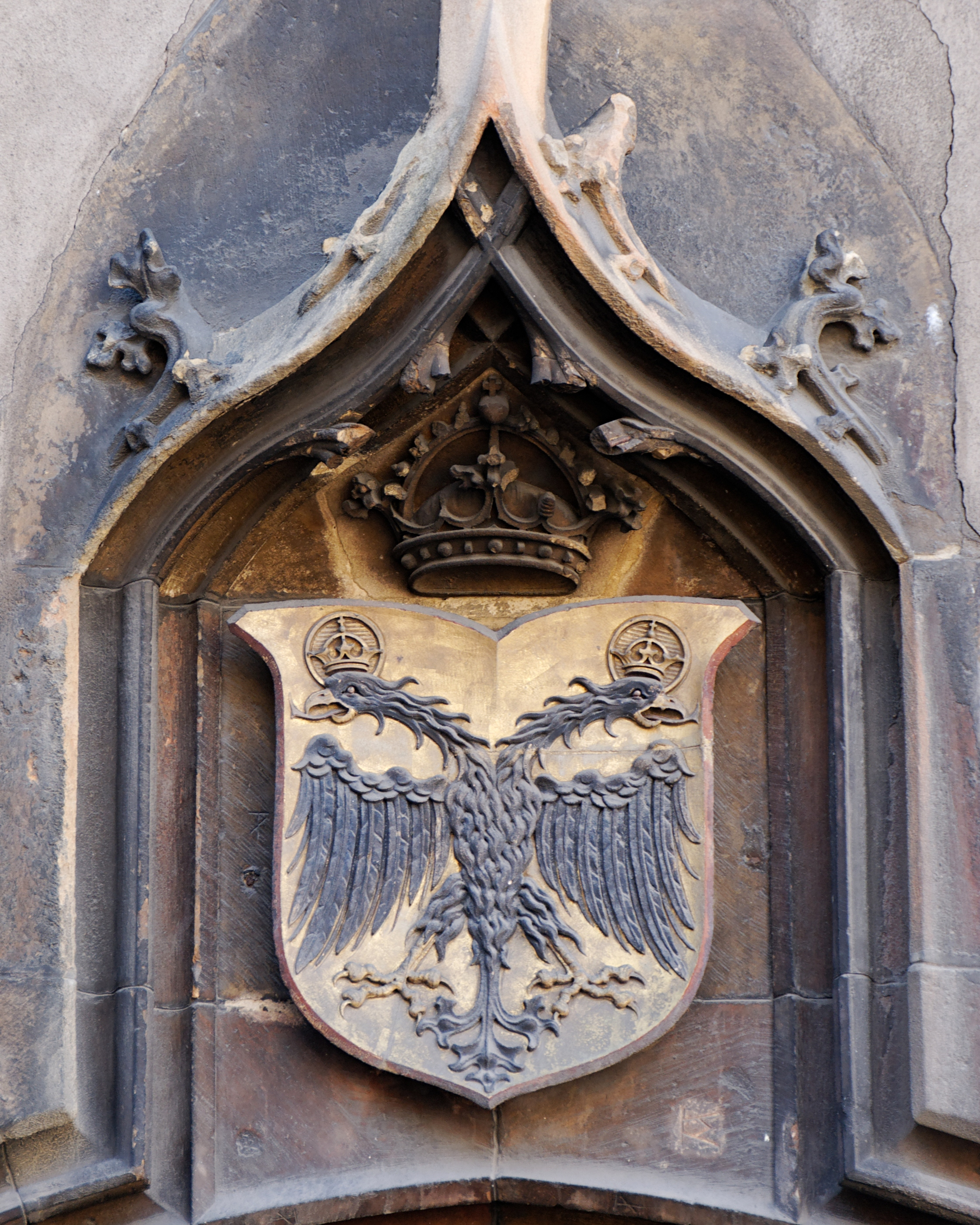
Imperial arms at the Koïfhus in Colmar (16th century)

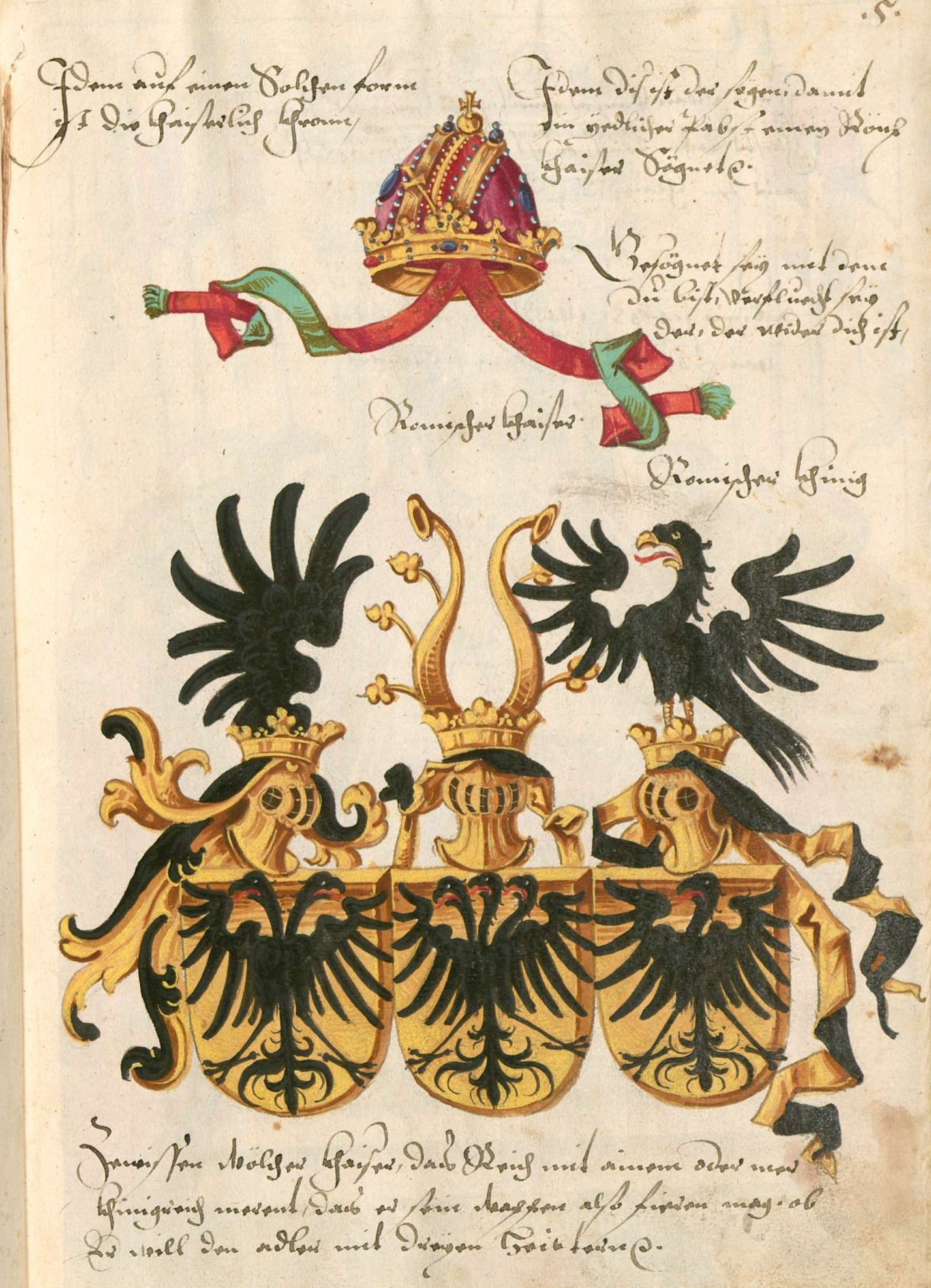
The imperial eagle depicted with one, two and three heads (after Conrad Grünenberg 1483, copy of 1602/4)

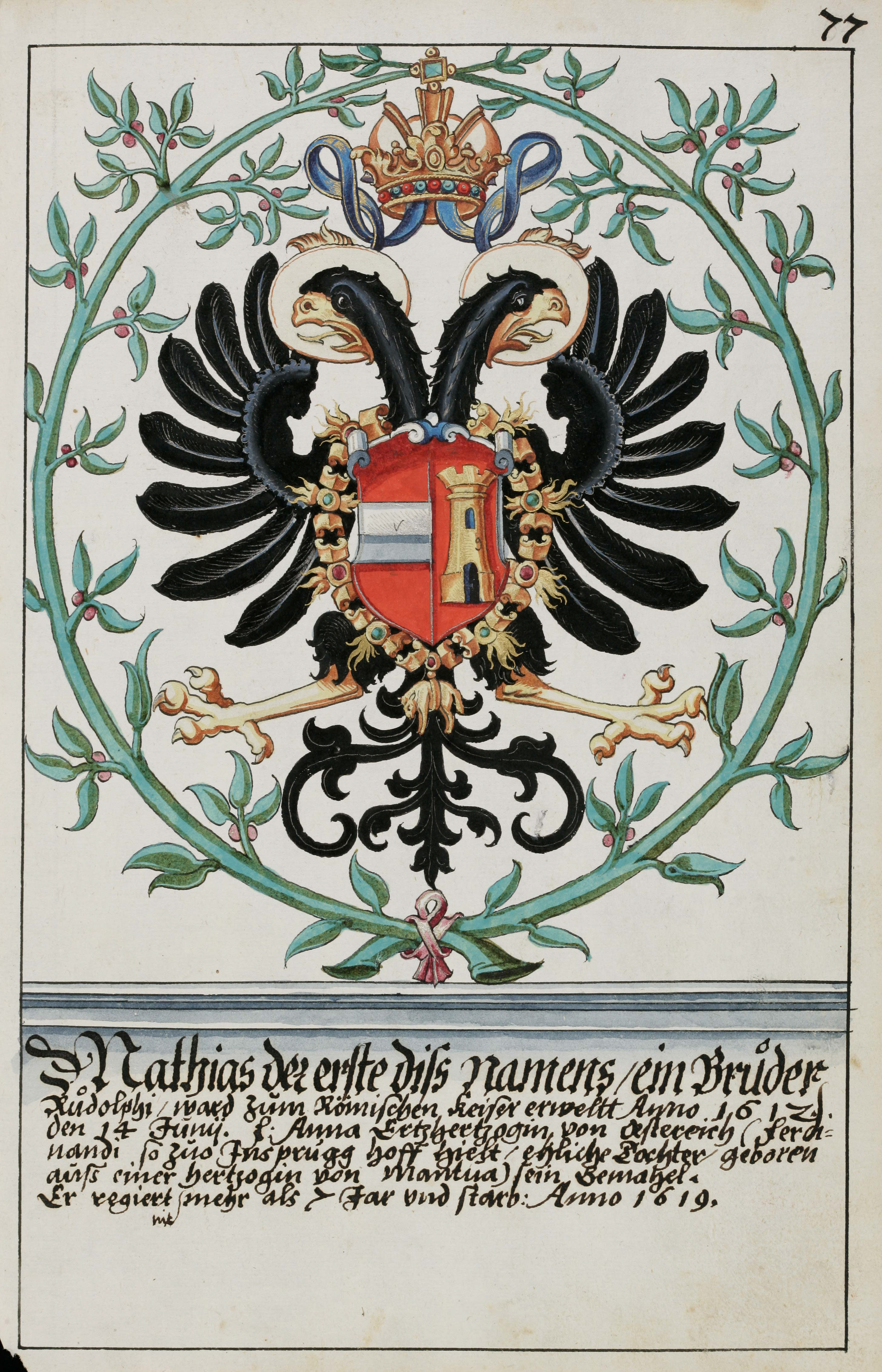
Imperial arms of Mathias (r. 1612–1619) by Hans Ulrich Fisch (1627)

=== Modern history ===
Coat of arms of the Austrian Empire (1804–1867); also used as the lesser arms of Austria-Hungary (1867–1915).

Coat of arms of the short-lived German Empire (1848–49); the German Confederation used a similar eagle.

Reichsadler (official design 1888–1918) of the (Second) German Empire

Bundesadler of the First Austrian Republic (1919–1934)

Reichsadler (1919–1928) of the Weimar Republic

Austrian coat of arms used during the Federal State of Austria 1934–1938

Parteiadler of the Nazi Party (1933–1945), with head looking to its left

Reichsadler (1935–1945) of Nazi Germany, with head looking to its right

Reichsadler (1928–1935) of the Weimar Republic and Bundesadler (1950–present) of the Federal Republic of Germany

Bundesadler of the Second Austrian Republic (since 1945) – with broken chains added to symbolize the end of fascism

== See also ==
- Aquila (Roman)
- Armorial of the Holy Roman Empire
- Byzantine heraldry
- Coat of arms of Austria
- Coat of arms of Bogotá
- Coat of arms of Brandenburg
- Coat of arms of Germany
- Coat of arms of Prussia
- Coat of arms of Russia
- Double-headed eagle
- Imperial Eagle beaker
- Quaternion Eagle
