= Imperial Eagle beaker =

Holy Roman Empire drinking vessel

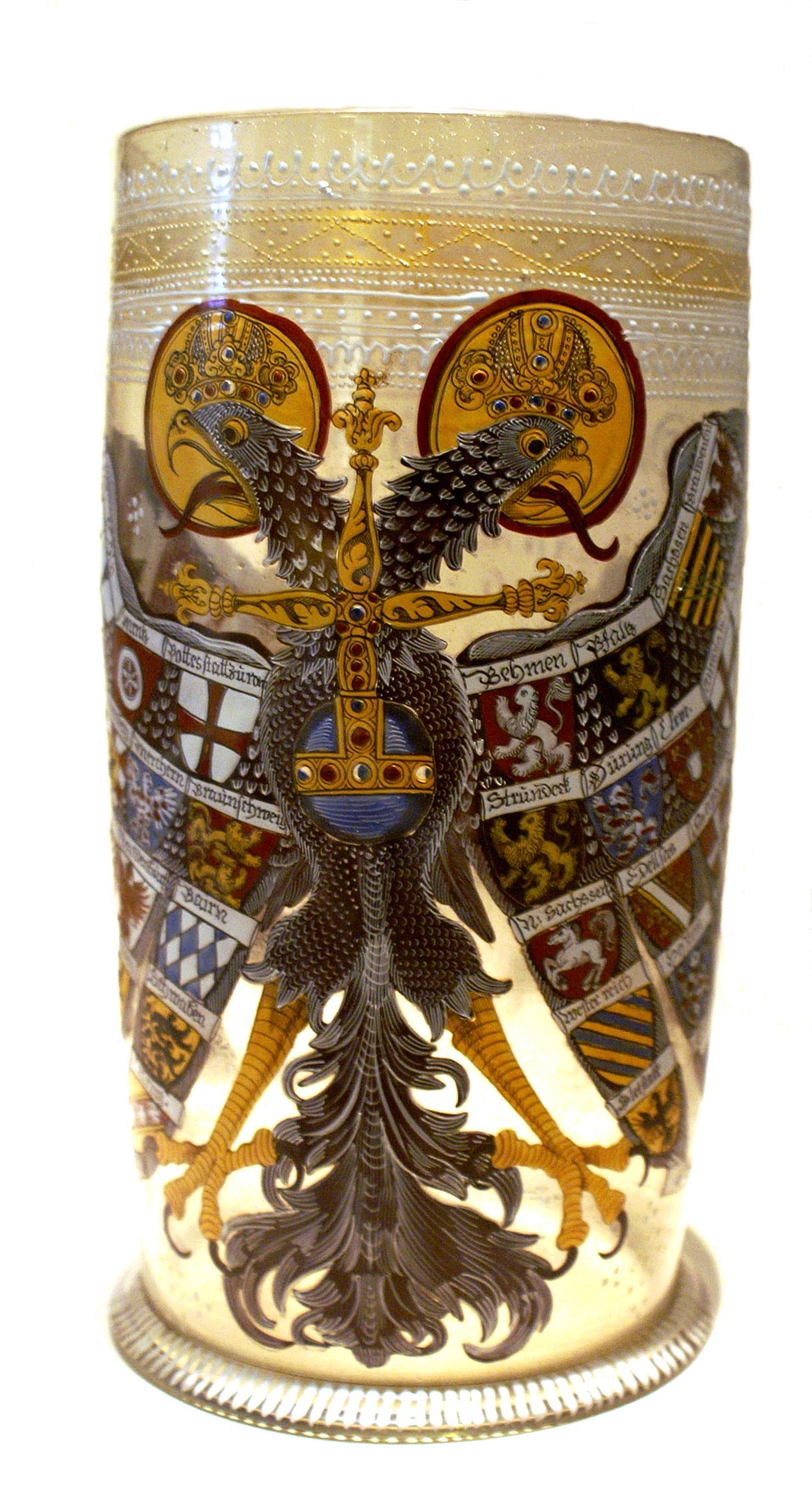
An example of a Reichsadlerhumpen on display at the Deutsches Historisches Museum

An Imperial Eagle beaker (German: Reichsadlerhumpen), or eagle glass, was a popular drinking vessel from the 16th until the late 18th century in the Holy Roman Empire. The enamelled glass was decorated with a double-headed eagle, usually in the shape of a Quaternion Eagle. The Reichsadler means "Imperial Eagle" or double-headed eagle which was the emblem of the empire, while "humpen" refers to a cylindrical drinking glass. These beakers became the essential medium to represent the most popular explanatory model for the emergence of the Empire: the quaternion theory as represented by Hans Burgkmair.

The Imperial Eagle beakers showed the solidarity between the owner and the Empire and were very popular because of their decorativeness and luminous colors. But these drinking vessels were also valued for their generous size. Equally popular were the electors' beakers, which were decorated with illustrations of the emperor and electors as the most important representatives of the Empire.

Many good examples of Imperial Eagle beakers are on display in museums worldwide. At auctions well-preserved pieces achieve a selling price of up to several thousand euros.

== Appearance ==
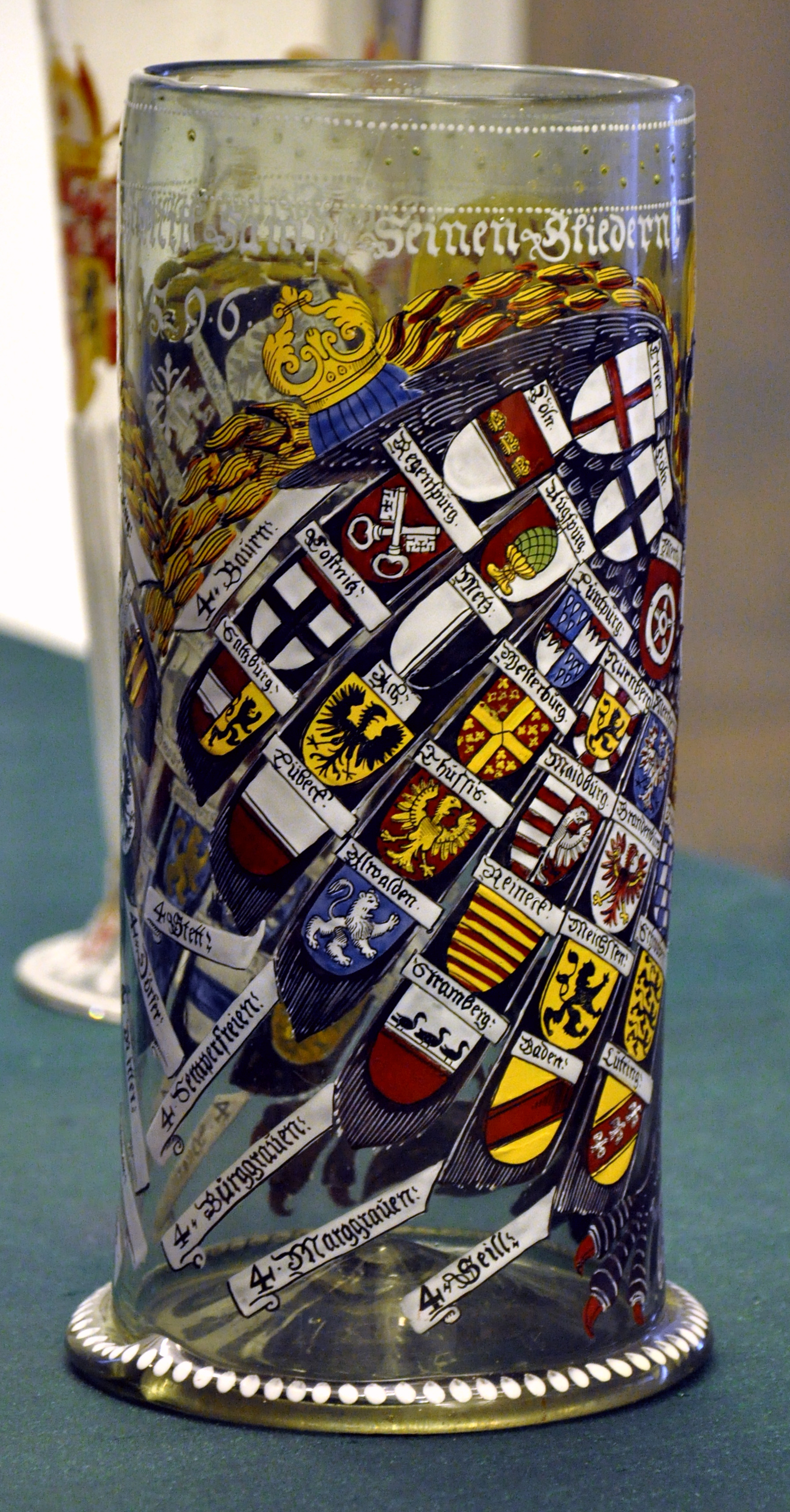
Example dated 1596

Most Imperial Eagle beakers had a capacity of three to four liters and were crafted from white or coloured glass. The cylindrical Imperial Eagle beakers are 20 to 32 cm in height and have a diameter of 10 to 15 cm. These beakers were occasionally crafted with a lid and a foot made out of brass or tin. The decorations were painted on the glass with glass enamel. This technique had reached Germany from Venice via Tirol. Using the enamel method, the paints were blended with crushed glass. After the surface was painted, the glasses were heated once again in order to melt the newly painted colour onto the surface. With this method, the durability of the painting and brightly shining colours was achieved.

Originally, the eagle was represented with the holy cross or a picture of the crucified Jesus on its chest. The cross symbolized the Christian foundation of the Empire with the Imperial eagle protecting the church. Since the beginning of the 17th century, the crucified Jesus has generally been replaced with a representation of the Empire's orb.

A total of 56 coats of arms of prince-electors, as well as of estates of the Empire and of imperial cities are depicted on the wings in quaternion formation as a symbol of the Imperial Constitution. The coats of arms of both the electors and the Pope are placed in the first row next to the eagle's head. Below, twelve stripes with four coats of arms each can be seen. Representations of the imperial eagle, the emperor and the electors have been common since the rule of Leopold I at the end of the 17th century. The double-headed eagle, which symbolizes the Empire as a whole, is crowned and given a halo as a sign of the sanctity of the empire.

Dedications can often be found on the back of the Imperial Eagle beaker, as well as explanations of the representation, the date of creation and the name of the glass creator.

On a beaker from 1669, which today is exhibited in the museum "Grimma", one can read the following passage:

The Holy Roman Empire; with all members in the year 1669 Hanß George Sommer [1].

Toasts and blessings from the end of the Thirty Years' War point to the use of the Imperial Eagle beaker at welcoming ceremonies. They were also used at the meetings of guilds: the large capacity is an indication of this.

== History and meaning ==
In the 16th and 17th century representations of the emperor, electors and the imperial eagle were very popular. Images on wood and copper engravings of well-known contemporary artists often served as models for the decoration of implements and objects of daily use. Apart from the imperial eagle beaker, drinking vessels made of stoneware, pewter plates and stove tiles also carried these motifs.

A beaker from 1571, which is currently on display at the British Museum in London, is considered the oldest exemplar. One of the five oldest beakers from 1572 is on display at the 'Württembergischen Landesmuseum' in Stuttgart. Imperial eagle beakers continued to be produced almost unaltered until the middle of the eighteenth century, at which time it seems as if production came to an end. The beakers were mainly produced in Bohemia, Saxony, Thuringia, Hesse and in the Fichtelgebirge. The significance of the imperial eagle beakers for the glassware craft in those regions can be seen by the fact that the glassmakers' guild of the Bohemian Kreibitz in 1669 demanded the production of an imperial eagle beaker as a masterpiece in one and a half days.

Through the Imperial Eagles the ideal of the durable unity of the Holy Roman Empire took decorative shape and demonstrates the emotional relationship of a broad public to the Empire. The imperial eagle was mostly pictured in the form of a quaternion eagle which related the theory of quaternions to one of the most important symbols of the Empire. As the structure of the Empire was in need of explanation, even for contemporaries, the quaternion model was meant to depict the fabric of the Empire. It was developed in the 14th century and remained popular until the end of the Empire. The model divided the classes of the Empire into fictitious groups of four, the quaternions, whose members shared one common feature: hence, the group of worldly electors, the margraves, et cetera. This, however, often caused misleading and inappropriate constellations due to the endeavour to come up to the quaternion. Nevertheless, the success of the model was not affected.

Early modern drinking culture, in which toasting was a very important custom, resulted in the beaker being connected to the "Imperial Eagle" as an expression of solidarity between the owner and the Empire. This connection with the Empire was especially strong for the "man on the street" and among the lower classes generally. For this reason the Imperial Eagle Beaker was mostly found amongst the lower aristocracy and the bourgeoisie; i.e. amongst Patricians and in city guilds. Most of the proven beaker-owners were craftsmen and guilds. Only a few exemplars have been found in baronial ownership.

The term "Roman Empire" was frequently used in connection with the Imperial Eagle beaker. In Richard Braithwaite's (1588–1673) work "Disputatio inauguralis theoretico-practica jus potandi", written in 1616 under the pseudonym "Blasius Multibibus“ and published anonymously in the same year in the German translation with the title "Ius Potandi" (or "Drinking laws"), we can read that, to ward off melancholy:

one must invite merry men / and good friends round / to wipe the dust off the Roman Empire and other drinking lords (? vnd andern Sauff Lauxen )/ and so encourage merry revelling and drinking parties.

The historian Sven Lüken assumes that Johann Wolfgang von Goethe was thinking of an Imperial Eagle beaker when he has the revellers in Auerbach's cellar sing:

The dear Holy Roman Empire, how does it stay together?

At the end of the 19th century, Imperial Eagle beakers were frequently faked.

== See also ==
- Armorial of the Holy Roman Empire
- Quaternion Eagle
- Cage cup
- Caneworking
- Venetian glass
