= An-Nur =

24th chapter of the Qur'an

Surah 24 of the Quran
النور An-Nur The Light
- Qira'ah; English text
- Classification: Medinan
- Position: Juzʼ 18
- Hizb no.: 36
- No. of verses: 64
- No. of Rukus: 9

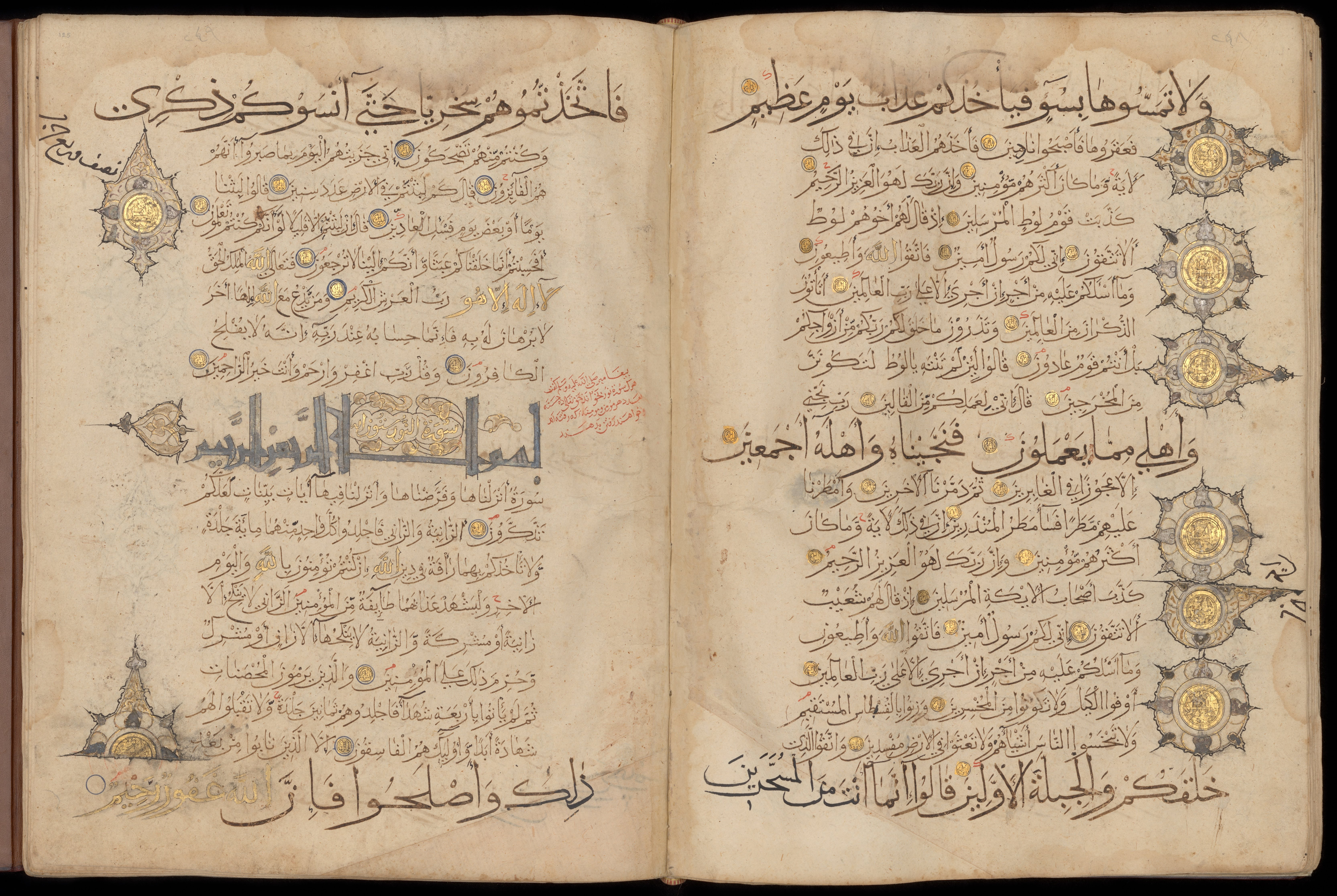
Double-page from the Qur'an with chapter heading and the first five verses of the sura An-Nur (left side). Iran, 1186.

An-Nur (Arabic: النور, romanized: an-nūr, lit. 'The Light') is the 24th chapter of the Quran with 64 verses. The surah takes its name, An Nur, from verse 35.

== Summary ==
- 1 This chapter revealed from heaven
- 2-3 Law relating to fornication
- 4-5 Punishment for defaming virtuous women
- 6-10 Law relating to charge of adultery when made by a husband against his wife
- 11-20 Aisha's slanderers reproved, and their punishment
- 21 Believers warned against evil deeds
- 22 The rich to forgive the poor, and bestow charity upon them
- 23-25 False accusers of virtuous women for ever accursed
- 26 Wicked men and women condemned to each other's society
- 27-29 Manners to be observed in visiting each other's homes
- 30-31 Pious men and women exhorted to modest demeanour
- 32 Marriageable women to be married if possible
- 32 Men-servants and maid-servants to be married when honest
- 33 Unmarried Muslims exhorted to continence
- 33 Masters to encourage slaves to purchase their freedom
- 34 The Quran an admonition to the pious
- 35 The similitude of God's light
- 36-38 The conduct of true believers described
- 39 Infidelity likened to a desert mirage or the darkness of a stormy sea
- 40-41 God praised by all his creatures
- 42-45 God revealed in all the phenomena of nature
- 46-56 Hypocrites rebuked and warned
- 57-58 Regulations relating to personal and family privacy
- 59-60 Exception in case of aged women, blind, lame, and sick
- 61 Muslims commanded to salute one another
- 62-63 True believers exhorted to implicit obedience to the Apostle of God
- 64 The Omniscient God will judge all men

The general agreement of scholars is that this surah was revealed shortly before or after the Battle of the Trench in 5 AH. The surah begins with various explanations and decrees on or relating to corrupt sexual acts, family law, and specifications on the giving of testimony. Foremost amongst these rulings is God's punishment for adultery. This section ends with the pronouncement that good men and women should be paired together, as should corrupt men and corrupt women. This discussion turns into reflections on privacy and modesty, namely of hosts and women. Contained herein are several regulations and explanations of modesty, most directly lines traditionally used to argue for the wearing of hijab. After these prohibitions are cast for women, the text turns towards men, asking them not to oppress slavegirls into prostitution, and to marry those women who need husbands, despite their poverty.

== Exegesis ==
=== 2-4 Unlawful sexual intercourse ===
Most of the rules related to fornication, adultery and false accusations from a husband to his wife or from members of the community to chaste women, can be found in chapter 24, which starts by giving very specific rules about punishment for unlawful sexual intercourse (zināʾ):

Flog the adulteress and the adulterer, each one of them, with a hundred lashes. Let no pity for them cause you to disobey God, if you truly believe in God and the Last Day; and let their punishment be witnessed by a number of believers.

— Qur'an 24:2

Q24:2 The [unmarried] woman or [unmarried] man found guilty of sexual intercourse - lash each one of them with a hundred lashes, and do not be taken by pity for them in the religion of Allah, if you should believe in Allah and the Last Day. And let a group of the believers witness their punishment.

Q24:2 The Zaniyah and the Zani, flog each of them with a hundred stripes. Let not pity withhold you in their case, in a punishment prescribed by Allah, if you believe in Allah and the Last Day. And let a party of the believers witness their punishment.

Tafsir Ibn Kathir says in relation to the witnessing of their punishment: "This is more humiliating for the people who are guilty of illegal sex, if they are flogged in front of the people. This is because it is more effective as a deterrent and it conveys the sense of scandal and rebuke".

Q24:4 And those who accuse chaste women, and produce not four witnesses, flog them with eighty stripes, and reject their testimony forever. They indeed are the rebellious. Except those who repent thereafter and do righteous deeds; (for such) verily, Allah is Oft-Forgiving, Most Merciful.

In Tafsir Ibn Kathir, the prescribed punishment for making false accusations against chaste men or women is to flog them with eighty stripes, and reject their testimony forever.

"And those who accuse chaste women then do not bring four witnesses, flog them, (giving) eighty stripes, and do not admit any evidence from them ever; and these it is that are the transgressors. Except those who repent after this and act aright, for surely Allah is Forgiving, Merciful."

— Qur'an, Sura 24 (Light), chapter 4–5

=== 35 "the Light Verse" ===
After a second statement of the Quran's status as a clear sign from God, the famed Verse of Light appears. This is often referred to as "the Light Verse", or "the Parable of Light", a mystical group of lines that has been the subject of much scholarship and reflection.

"GOD is the light of heaven and earth: the similitude of his light is as a niche in a wall, wherein a lamp is placed, and the lamp enclosed in a case of glass; the glass appears as it were a shining star. It is lighted with the oil of a blessed tree, an olive neither of the east, nor of the west:z it wanteth little but that the oil thereof would give light, although no fire touched it. This is light added unto light:a GOD will direct unto his light whom he pleaseth. GOD propoundeth parables unto men; for GOD knoweth all things."

=== 36-44 believers will be rewarded ===
^{[Quran 24:36]} The Quran here briefly returns to a slightly more literal form of speech as it reassures believers that their remembrance will be rewarded, as the forgetfulness of the sinners will be punished. In keeping with the Verse of Light, the unbelievers too are explained in metaphor, returning to the deeply symbolic tone above:

"And as for the unbelievers, their works are as a mirage in a spacious plain, in which a thirsty man thinks there to be water, until when he comes to it, he finds it is nothing; there indeed he finds God and He pays him his account in full; and God is swift in the reckoning; or they are as shadows upon a sea obscured, covered by a billow above which is a billow above which are clouds; shadows piled one upon the other; when he puts forth his hand, wellnigh he cannot see it. And whoever God assigns no light, no light has he." (Lines 39–40)

The Quran explains that the Earth itself is evidence of God's reality and power. He controls the clouds, the winds, the hail, and the mountains. It is also explained in this surah that God created all creatures from water, including animals with four feet, animals with two feet, and animals without any feet.

=== 45 Birth and social status ===
^{[Quran 24:45]} The Quran confirms that God has sent down signs (verse) to make His reality clear, and that understanding that reality is as a "straight path", that if one is truly following, one can never be led astray. God keeps His word, and will continue to reward those who believe and keep to their religion, as He has rewarded others in the past for doing the same.

The Book urges the believer not to fret, and not to accuse people of sin merely for the conditions of their birth or social status. For example, in many tribal cultures a blind person or their parents were believed to be wicked, hence the gods or the spirits have blinded them. The Quran urges one not to think in this manner, and instead remember that all things are signs from God, and thus all believers should be of good nature to others, and wish them blessings from God. If that is done, the signs become clear and "haply you will understand".

As the believer must greet others well, so must they ask for leave from them before departing. However, the surah ends, God knows the hidden reasons people do as they do, "God knows those of you who slip away surreptitiously", for when all returns to Him, they will testify against themselves to Him.
