= Mishkat al-Anwar =

Book by Al-Ghazali

Mishkāt al-Anwār or The Niche of Lights is an exegetical text written by the Islamic theologian Al-Ghazali (1058-1111) that discusses the Quran's Verse of Light.

== Description ==
The commentary, probably written toward the end of the author's life, interprets this verse and a related hadith from a Sufi perspective. Among other things, it describes the metaphysics of light and the relationship between divine light and the human soul. It is written in terse language and cites numerous Quranic passages in its argument.

The text has three chapters. Chapter one analyzes the first sentence of the verse, and chapters two and three expand on the interpretation outlined. God's light, also identified with existence and knowledge, is described as the source underpinning creation. Al-Ghazali frequently uses analogies between the natural and supernatural world in his argument. He describes the role of purification in the soul's attempt to grasp divine illumination and the "holy prophetic spirit".
