= Verse of Light =

Verse of the Quran

The Verse of Light (Arabic: آیة النور, romanized: āyat an-nūr) is the 35th verse of the 24th surah of the Quran (Q24:35). It has often been closely associated with Sufi thought, primarily because of al-Ghazali's commentary on it, entitled Mishkat al-Anwar (Niche of the Lights).

== Verse ==
Translation	Translator
Allah is the skies’ Light and the earth. An example of His light is like a niche within which is a lamp, the lamp is within glass, the glass as if it was a pearly planet, fueled from a blessed tree, an olive tree, not eastern, nor western. Its oil would almost illuminate, even if no fire has touched it. Light upon Light. Allah guides for His light whoever He wills. And Allah thus cites the examples for the people. And Allah is with everything, Knowledgeable.	Samy Mahdy
Allah is The Light of the heavens and the earth; the similitude of His Light is as a niche wherein is a lamp, the lamp in a glass, the glass as it were a glittering planet-kindled from a Blessed Tree, an olive that is neither eastern nor western, whose oil would almost illuminate, even if no fire touched it, Light upon Light; Allah guides to His Light whomever He decides, and Allah strikes similitudes for mankind, and Allah is Ever-Knowing of everything.	Muhammad Mahmud Ghali
God is the Light of the heavens and the earth. The example of His Light is like a niche wherein is a lamp; the lamp is in a crystal, and the crystal, shining as if a pearl-like radiant star, lit from the oil of a blessed olive tree that is neither of the east nor of the west. The oil would almost give light of itself though no fire touches it. Light upon light! God guides to His Light whom He wills. God strikes parables for people. God has full knowledge of all things.	Ali Ünal
Allāh is the Light (Note: i.e., the source and bestower of light and enlightenment.) of the heavens and the earth. The example of His light (Note: His guidance in the heart of a believing servant.) is like a niche within which is a lamp; (Note: Literally, "a burning wick," which is the essence of a lamp.) the lamp is within glass, the glass as if it were a pearly [white] star lit from [the oil of] a blessed olive tree, neither of the east nor of the west, whose oil would almost glow even if untouched by fire. Light upon light. Allāh guides to His light whom He wills. And Allāh presents examples for the people, and Allāh is Knowing of all things.	Saheeh International
Allah is the Light of the heavens and the earth. His light (Note: This is a metaphor for the light of guidance in the heart of the believer.) is like a niche in which there is a lamp, the lamp is in a crystal, the crystal is like a shining star, lit from “the oil of” a blessed olive tree, “located” neither to the east nor the west, (Note: Meaning, the olive tree is wholesome because it is located in a central place, so it is hit by sunrays all day-long, and, therefore, the oil is of a premium quality.) whose oil would almost glow, even without being touched by fire. Light upon light! Allah guides whoever He wills to His light. And Allah sets forth parables for humanity. For Allah has “perfect” knowledge of all things.	Mustafa Khattab
Allaah is the Light (the illuminator) of the heavens and the earth. The example of (the brightness and clarify of) His Light is like that of a niche in which there is a lamp. The lamp is within a glass, and the glass (because of its clarity) appears to be a shining star. The lamp is lit with (oil from) the blessed tree of the olive, which is neither easterly nor westerly (the sunlight falling on the tree is neither obscured when the sun rises in the east nor when it sets in the west. The tree therefore receives sunlight throughout the day, making the oil pure and easily combustible). (As a result) The oil is close to burning even though a fire does not touch it. Light upon light (the light of the lamp is bright because of the pure olive oil and is further brightened by the clear glass and because it is confined to the small area of the niche). Allaah guides to His light (Imaan) whoever He desires, and Allaah quotes examples for people (to guide them). Allaah has knowledge of all things.	Afzal Hoosen Elias

== Commentary ==
The verse has been the subject of many exegeses, having been commented by Avicenna, al-Ghazali, Fakhr al-Din al-Razi, Ibn al-'Arabi, Rumi, Mulla Sadra, Ibn Kathir, Al-Tabari, and Ibn Qayyim al-Jawziyya.

The eighth Imam of the Twelver Imami Shiites Ali ibn Musa says in the interpretation of this verse:

He is the guide of the people of heaven and the guide of the people of the earth.

and the sixth Shiite Imam, Jafar Sadiq, has stated that:

God first spoke of His light.

The example of God's guidance is in the heart of the believer.

The glorious is inside the believer and the lamp of his heart, and the lamp is the light that God has placed in his heart.

Hence it was and remains a key Qur'anic passage to many Sufis and Muslim philosophers into the present day, who argue for esoteric readings of the Qur'an. Al-Ghazali's reflections on this verse are collected in his Mishkat al-Anwar (the "Niche of Lights").

This verse is also the primary source of one of the 99 Names of God: an-Nur (النور), "The Light".

== See also ==
- Verse of Throne
- Nūr (Islam)
- Chapter of Light
- Chapter of Figs
