= Coat of arms of Lübeck =

Versions
- Lesser coat of arms of Lübeck
- Armiger: Free and Hanseatic City of Lübeck
- Crest: An eagle displayed
- Shield: Or, a double-headed eagle sable, overall an escutcheon party per fess argent and gules
- Supporters: Two lions rampant

The city of Lübeck has for a long time had a double coat of arms — one with the eagle as a symbol of the Imperial freedom enjoyed by the city from 1226 to 1937; one with Hanseatic colors of silver over red and the so-called Lübeck plate.

== History ==
The origin of the Lübeck shield is not certain, but thought to be derived from the Hanseatic flag, first seen on a ship's seal in 1230. This is also the oldest reference to its own national emblem of the city, with the Imperial eagle appearing a little later, first seen on early 14th-century coins. The colors of the shield are thought not to come from the County of Holstein, but from the Imperial arms. From around 1450 the two arms were found combined, the eagle bearing the Hanseatic coat of arms as breast shield. Its continued use today makes it not the oldest coat of arms of Schleswig-Holstein. The oldest coat of arms of Flensburg is older.

After the inclusion of Lübeck into the First French Empire on 1 January 1811, the city received a new coat of arms, to emphasise the position of Lübeck as a community within the French state. In this emblem, designed by the Conseil du Sceau, the traditional red-and-white coat of arms sat on a pair of black eagle's wings, an approximate representation of the Lübeck double eagle; this combination on a white field. As Lübeck was one of the Bonnes villes of the Empire, a chief gules, with three golden Imperial bees, was added. This coat of arms was awarded to Lübeck by Napoleon Bonaparte on 13 June 1811 with a signed Wappenbrief. After liberation from French rule in 1813, and the restoration of Lübeck's status as an independent city-state, the traditional coat of arms was reinstated.

With the abolition of Lübeck's independence in the Greater Hamburg Act of 1937, annexing it to the Free State of Prussia, as a part of the Province of Schleswig-Holstein, the city was permitted to keep its old coat of arms.

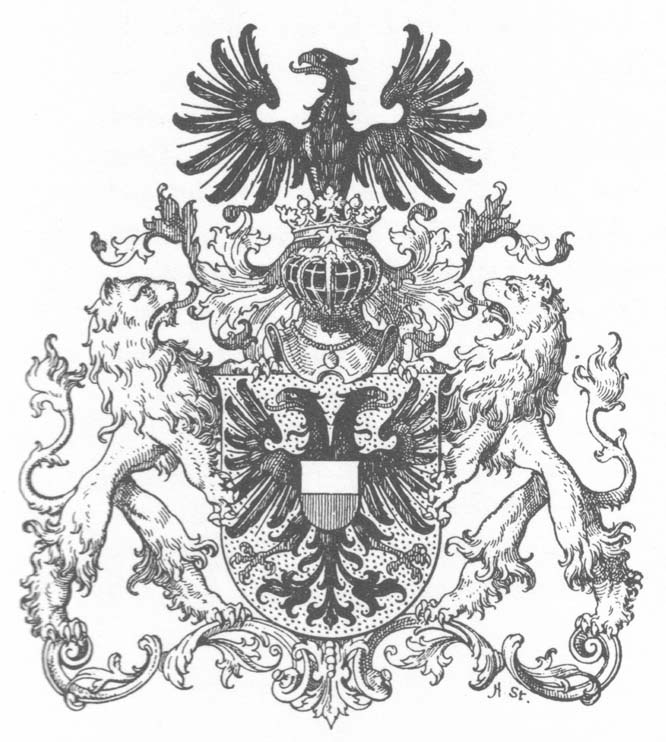
Greater coat of arms of the Free and Hanseatic City of Lübeck during the German Empire

An earlier representation of the coat of arms

Coat of arms used under Napoleonic rule (1811−1813)

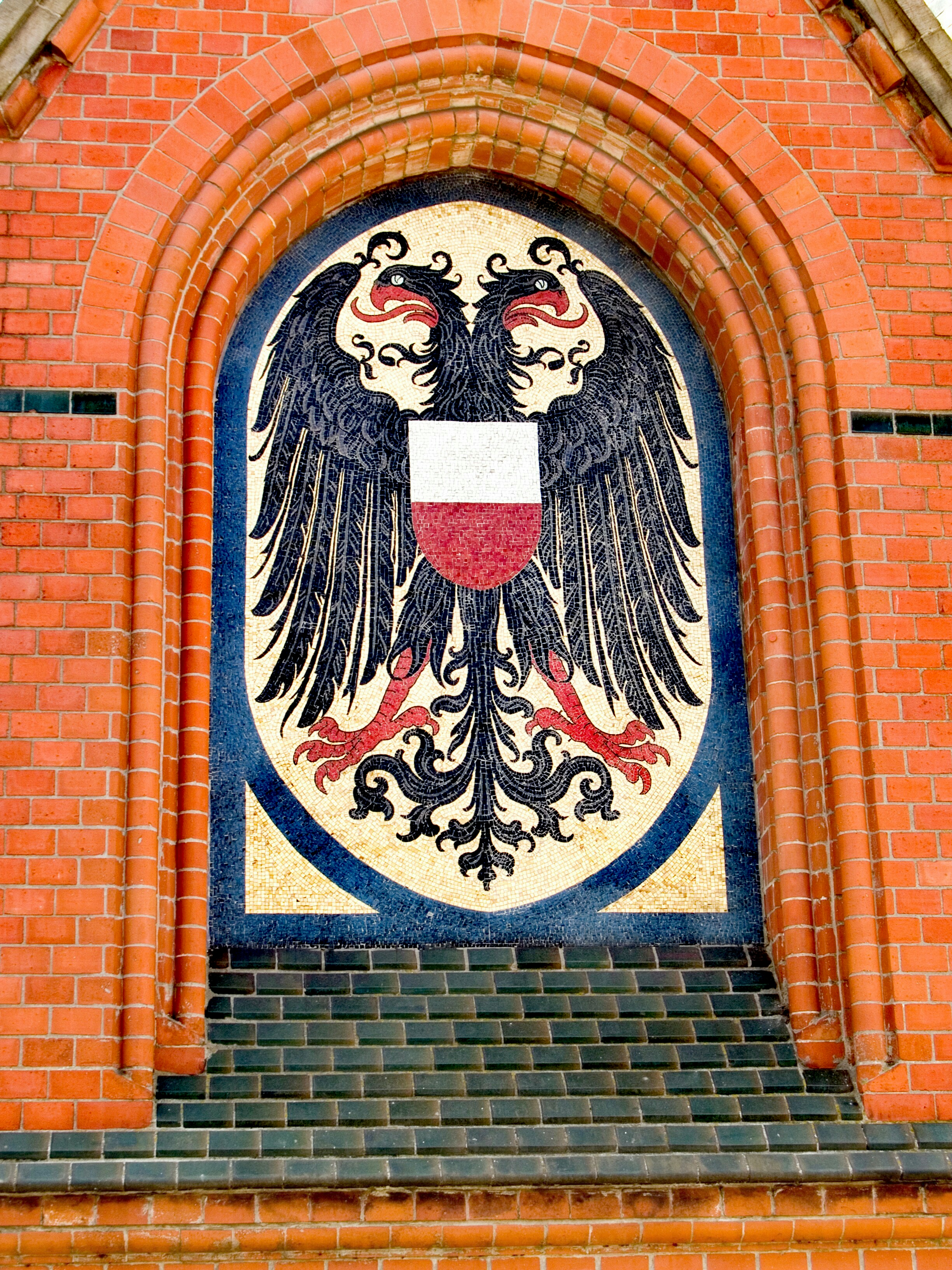
Mosaic from the vertical-lift bridge over the Elbe–Lübeck Canal below the castle gate

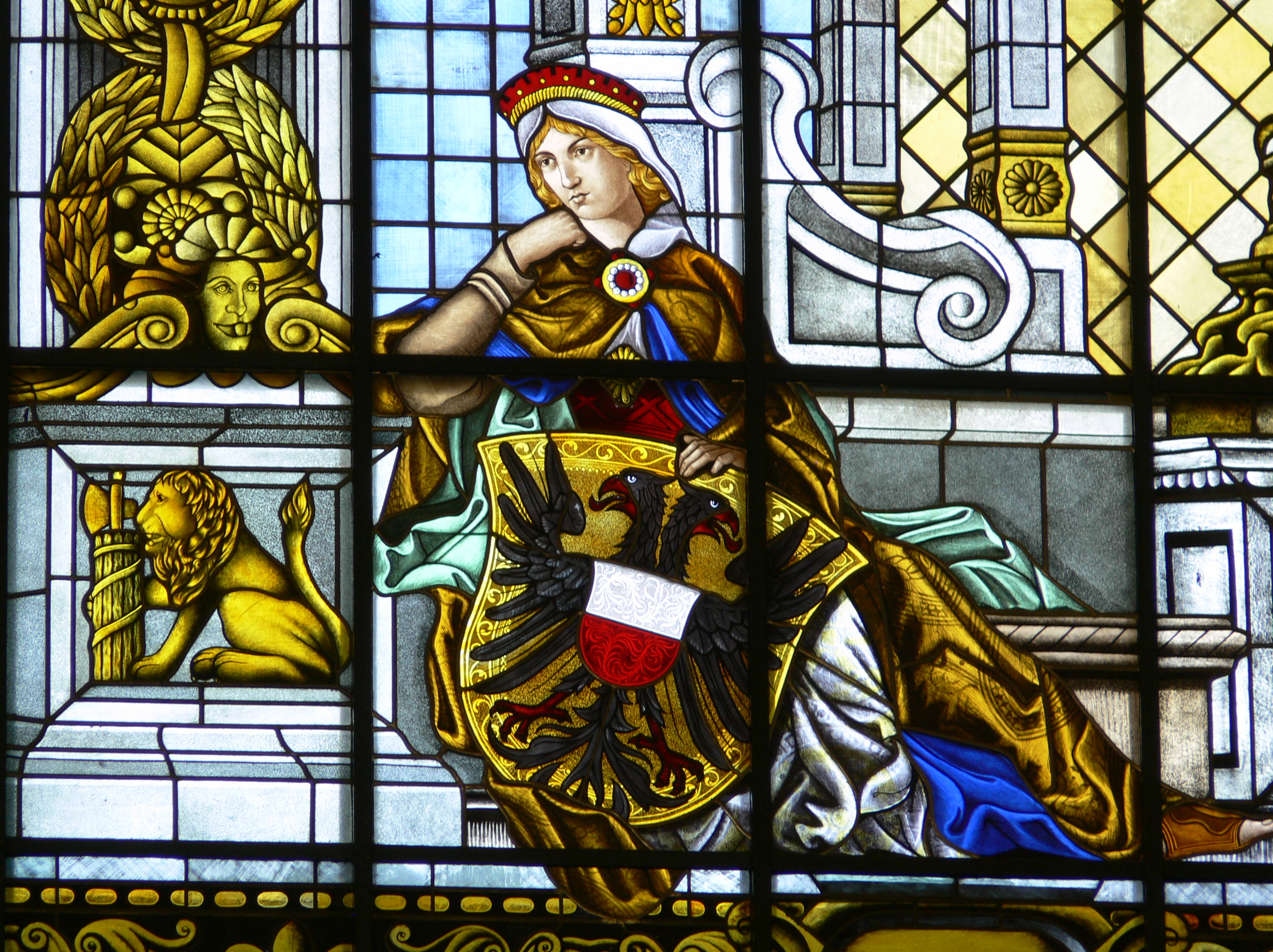
Coat of arms in a window of the Imperial Supreme Court building in Leipzig (now the Federal Administrative Court of Germany)

The official coat of arms of the city since 1997, designed by Professor Kurt Weidemann

== See also ==
- Free City of Lübeck
- Origin of the coats of arms of German federal states
