= Double-headed eagle =

Symbol used in heraldry

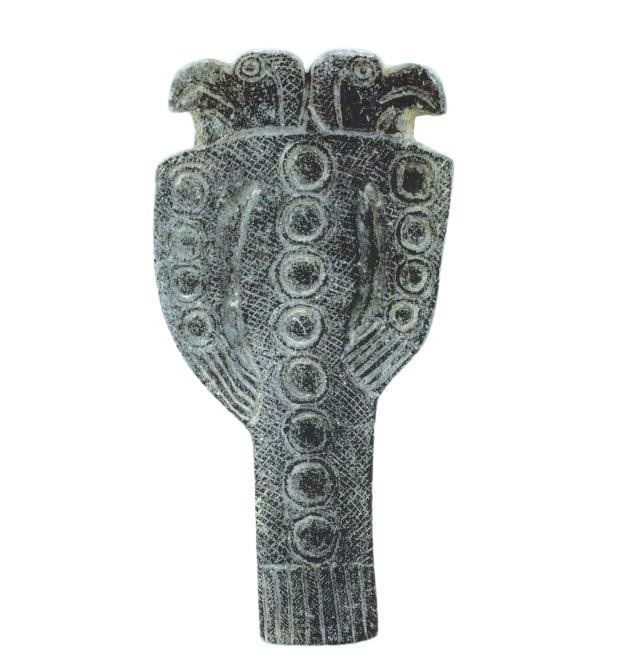
Double-headed eagle in Jiroft, Iran, 3rd millennium BC

The double-headed eagle is an iconographic symbol originating in the Bronze Age. The earliest predecessors of the symbol can be found in the Ancient Near East (i.e., Mesopotamia and Hittite iconography) and Mycenaean Greece. Most modern uses of the emblem are directly or indirectly associated with its use by the Palaiologos dynasty of the Byzantine Empire, a use possibly derived from the Roman Imperial Aquila. High medieval iterations of the motif can be found in Islamic Spain, France, the Bulgarian Empire and the Serbian principality of Raška. From the 13th century onward, it appeared within the Islamic world in the Seljuk Sultanate of Rum and the Mamluk Sultanate, and within the Christian world in Albania, the Holy Roman Empire, Russia, and Serbia. In a few places, among them the Holy Roman Empire and Russia, the motif was further augmented to create the less prominent triple-headed eagle.

== History ==
=== Bronze Age ===
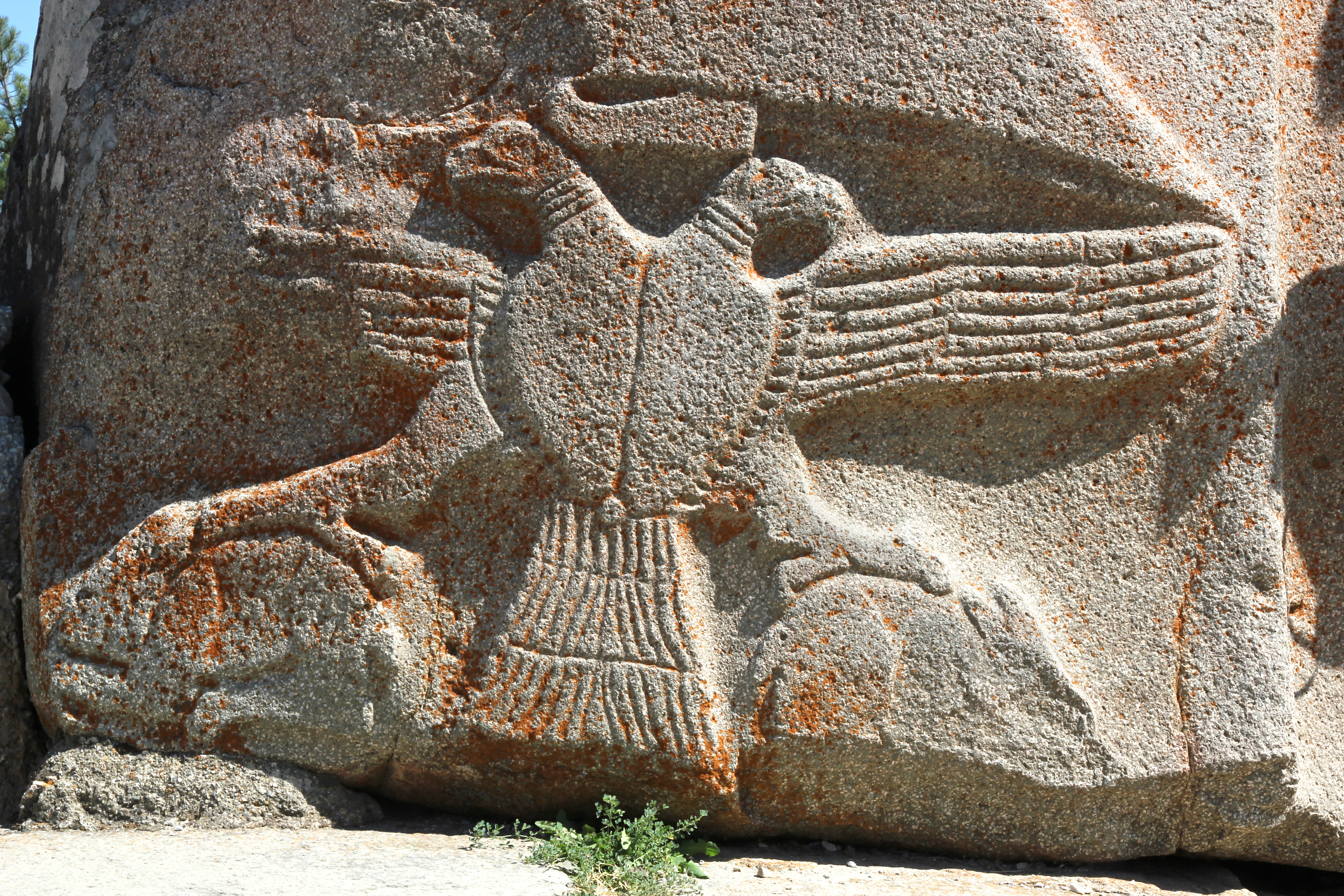
Double-headed eagle on the Sphinx Gates of the Hittites in Anatolia, today in Alaca Höyük, Turkey

Many-headed mythological beasts and bird creatures frequently appear in the Bronze Age and Iron Age pictorial legacy of the Ancient Near East, especially in Mesopotamia. They were later adopted by the Hittites. Use of the double-headed eagle in Hittite imagery has been interpreted as "royal insignia". A monumental Hittite relief of a double-headed eagle grasping two hares is found at the eastern pier of the Sphinx Gate at Alaca Hüyük. For more examples of double-headed eagles in the Hittite context see Jesse David Chariton's "The Function of the Double-Headed Eagle at Yazılıkaya." In Mycenaean Greece, double-headed eagles appear on Mycenaean pottery.

==== Bactria–Margiana Archaeological Complex ====
One of the earliest known depictions of a double-headed eagle appears on a ceremonial shaft-hole axe head from the Bactria–Margiana Archaeological Complex (BMAC), dated to the late 3rd and early 2nd millennium BC (Metropolitan Museum of Art, CC0).

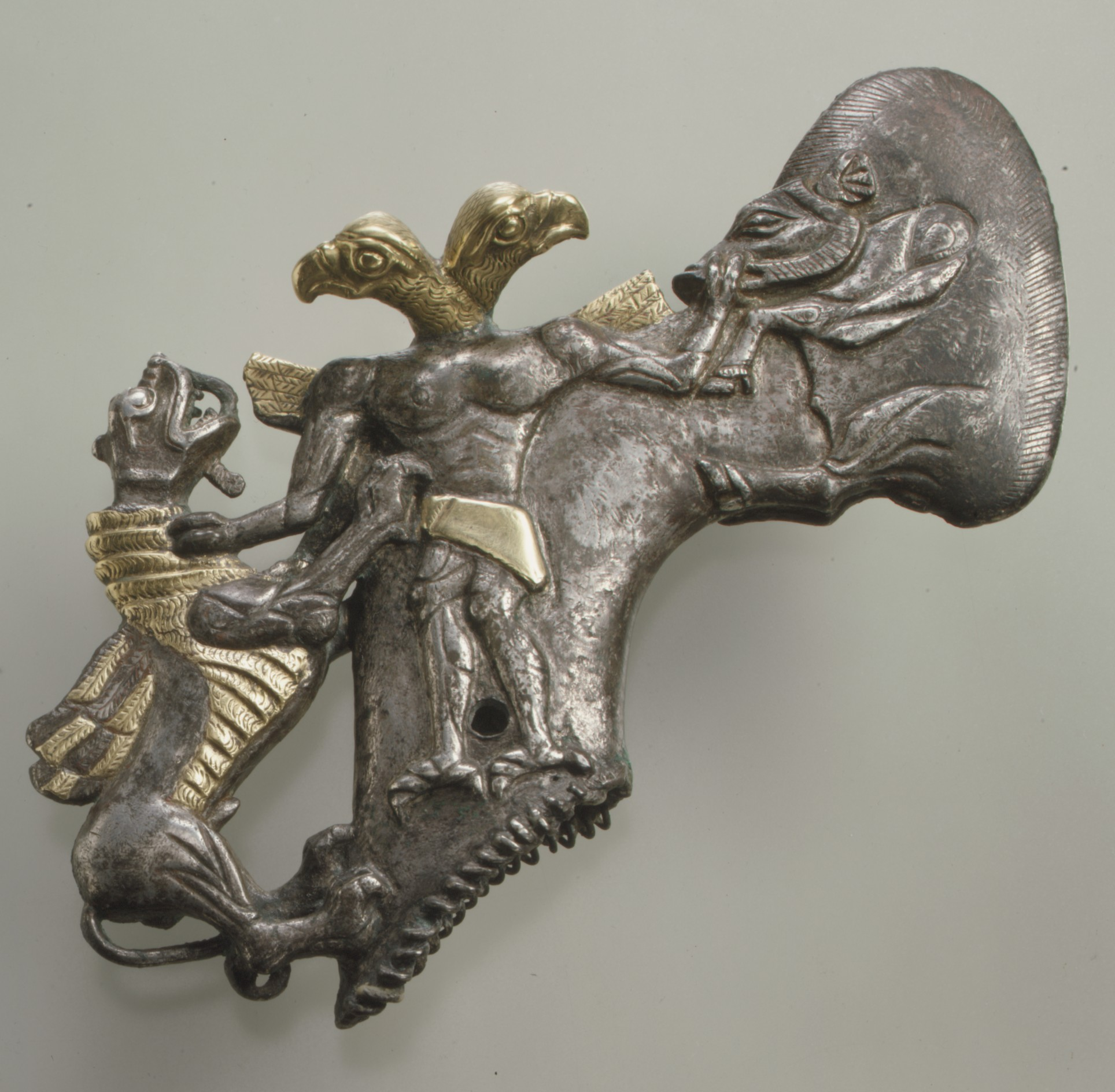
BMAC axe head with double-headed bird-demon motif, late 3rd to early 2nd millennium BC

=== Middle Ages ===
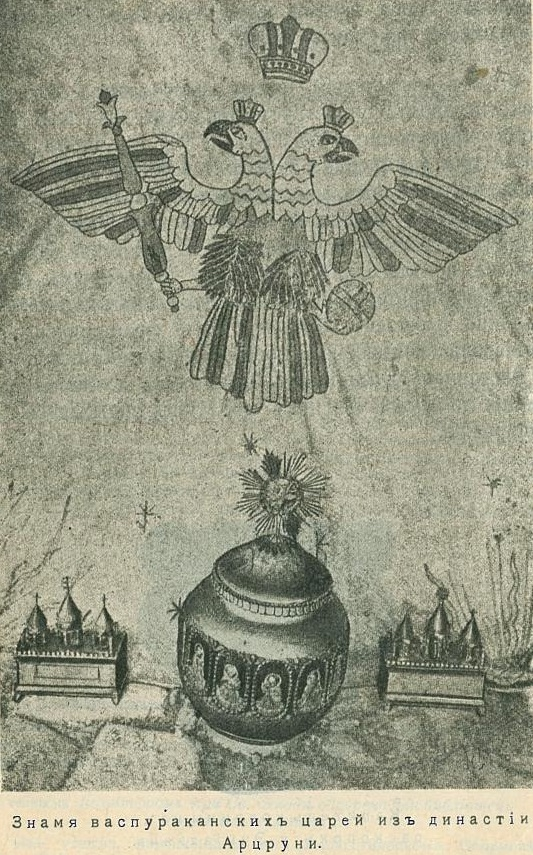
The double-headed eagle device used in the flag of Kingdom of Vaspurakan (r. 908–1021)

After the Bronze Age collapse, there is a gap of more than two millennia before the re-appearance of the double-headed eagle motif. The earliest occurrence in the context of the Byzantine Empire appears to be on a silk brocade dated to the 10th century, which was, however, likely manufactured in Islamic Spain; similarly early examples, from the 10th or 11th century, are from Bulgaria and from France.

==== Adoption in the Byzantine Empire ====
The early Byzantine Empire continued to use the (single-headed) imperial eagle motif. The double-headed eagle appears only in the medieval period, by about the 10th century in Byzantine art, but as an imperial emblem only much later, during the final century of the Palaiologos dynasty. In Western European sources, it appears as a Byzantine state emblem since at least the 15th century.

A modern theory, forwarded by Nicholas Zapheiriou, connected the introduction of the motif to Byzantine Emperor Isaac I Komnenos (1057–1059), whose family originated in Paphlagonia. Zapheiriou supposed that the Hittite motif of the double-headed bird, associated with the Paphlagonian city of Gangra (where it was known as Haga, Χάγκα), might have been brought to the Byzantine Empire by the Komnenoi.

==== Adoption in the Turkic and Muslim world ====
The double-headed eagle motif was adopted in the Seljuk Sultanate of Rûm and the Turkish beyliks of medieval Anatolia in the early 13th century. A royal association of the motif is suggested by its appearance on the keystone of an arch of the citadel built at Konya (Ikonion) under Kayqubad I (r. 1220–1237).

The motif appears on Turkomen coins of this era, notably on coins minted under Artuqid ruler Nasir al-Din Mahmud of Hasankeyf (r. 1200–1222). It is also found on some stone reliefs on the towers of Diyarbakır Fortress.

The Ilkhanid rulers also struck coins with the motif, Abaqa had them minted in Irbil (see coin 1, coin 2). While Arghun had them minted in Nishapur (see coin 1, coin 2, coin 3, coin 4, coin5).

Later in the 13th century, the motif was also adopted in Mamluk Egypt; it is notably found on the pierced-globe handwarmer made for Mamluk amir Badr al-Din Baysari (c. 1270), and in a stone relief on the walls of the Cairo Citadel.

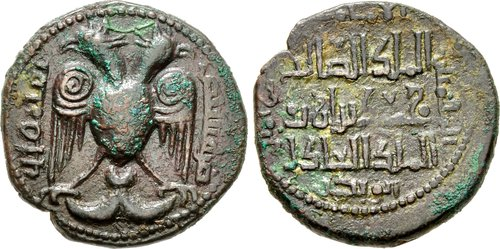
AE dirhem of the Artuqid ruler Nasir al-Din Mahmud (r. 1200–1222, struck in Hisn Kayfa, featuring the double-headed eagle on the obverse

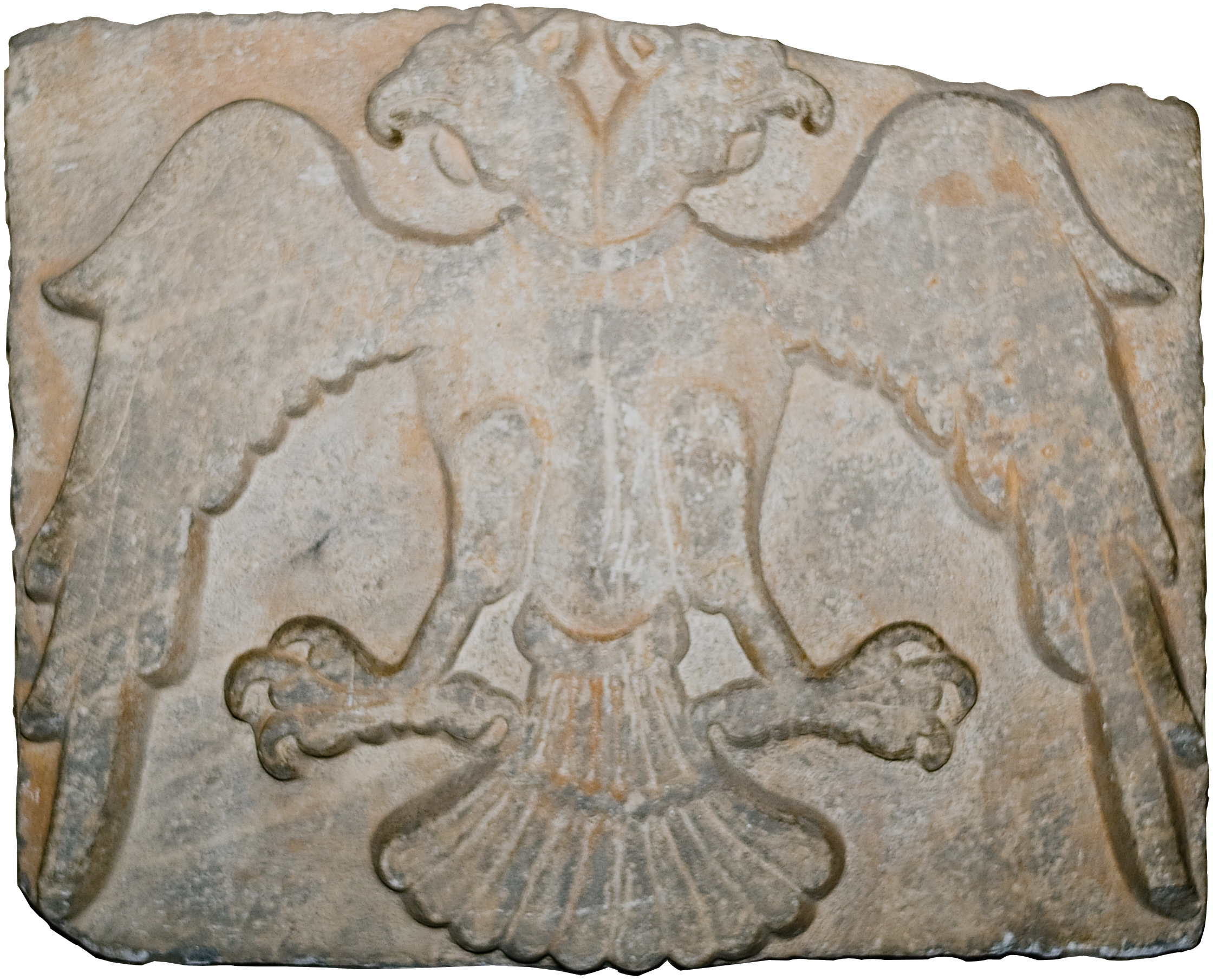
A double-headed eagle relief, 13th-century (Seljuk/Ayyubid period) architectural fragment found at Konya, now in Ince Minare Museum

==== Adoption in Christian Europe ====
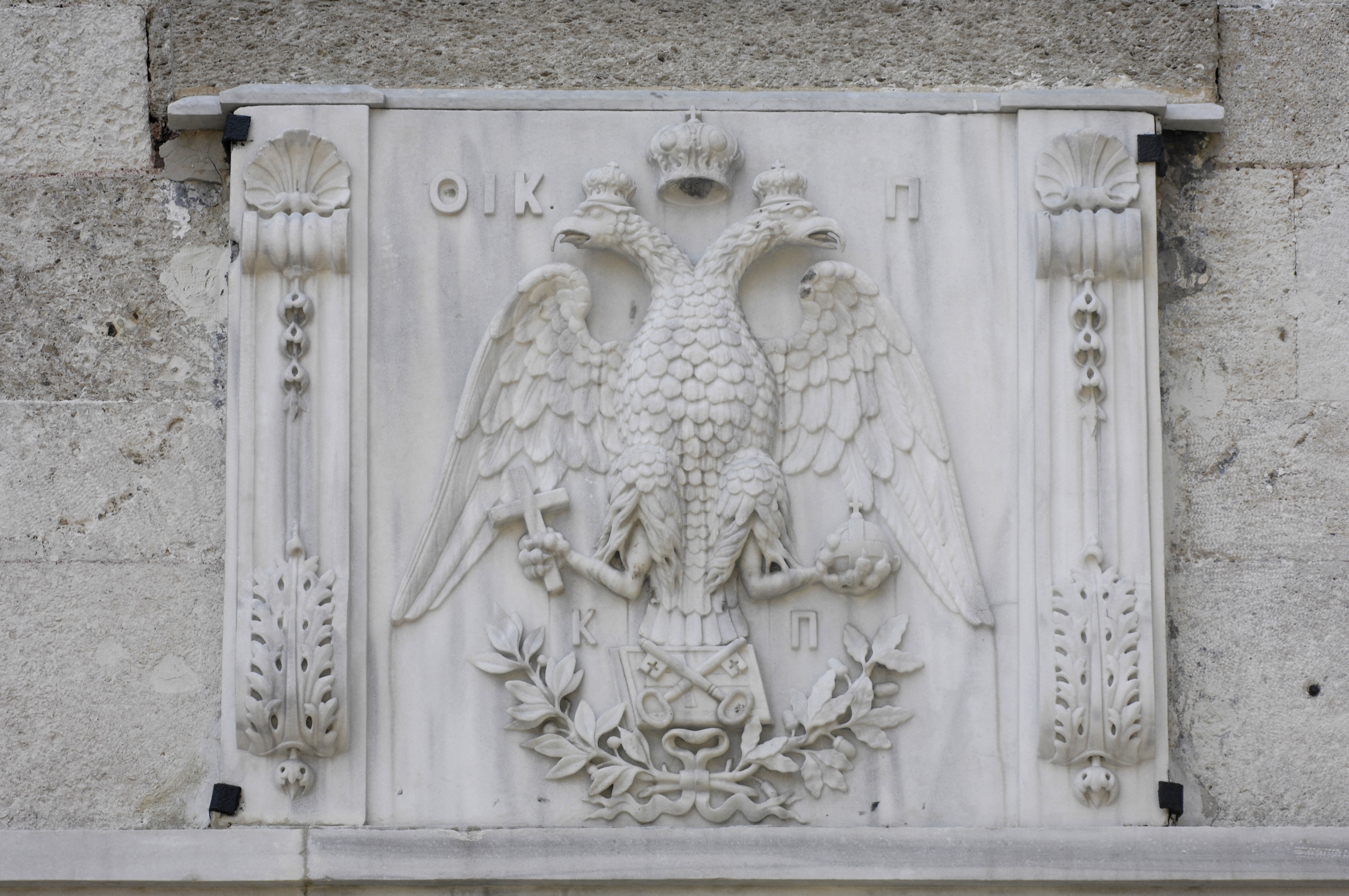
Emblem of the Ecumenical Patriarchate of Constantinople, entrance of St. George's Cathedral, Istanbul

Adoption of the double-headed eagle in Serbia, Albania, Russia and in the Holy Roman Empire begins still in the medieval period, possibly as early as the 12th century, but widespread use begins after the fall of Constantinople, in the late 15th century.

The oldest preserved depiction of a double-headed eagle in Serbia is the one found in the donor portrait of Miroslav of Hum in the Church of St. Peter and Paul in Bijelo Polje, dating to 1190. The double-headed eagle in the Serbian royal coat of arms is well attested in the 13th and 14th centuries.

An exceptional medieval depiction of a double-headed eagle in the West, attributed to Otto IV, is found in a copy of the Chronica Majora of Matthew of Paris (Corpus Christi College, Cambridge, Parker MS 16 fol. 18, 13th century).

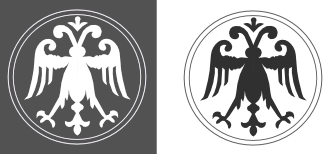
Drawing of the double-headed eagle as shown in the donor portrait of Miroslav of Hum in Bijelo Polje (1190)

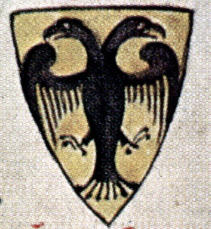
First double-headed eagle as Reichsadler, from Chronica Majora (c. 1250)

Seal of Ivan III of Russia (1472)

=== Early modern use ===
==== Serbia ====
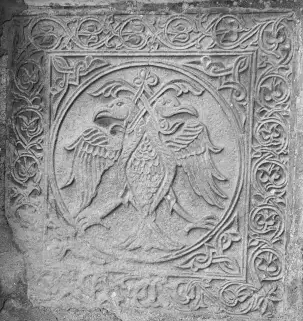
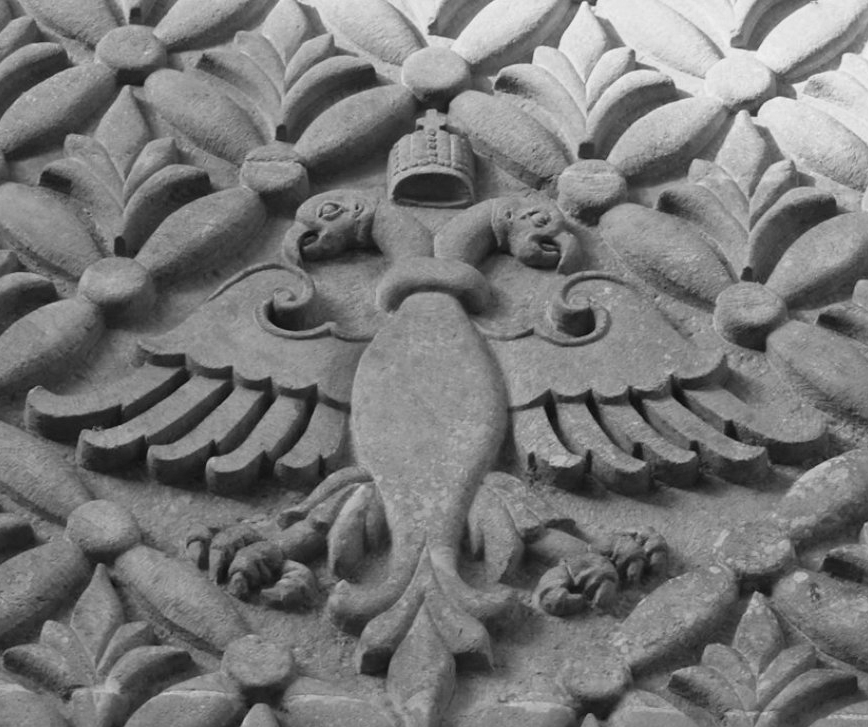
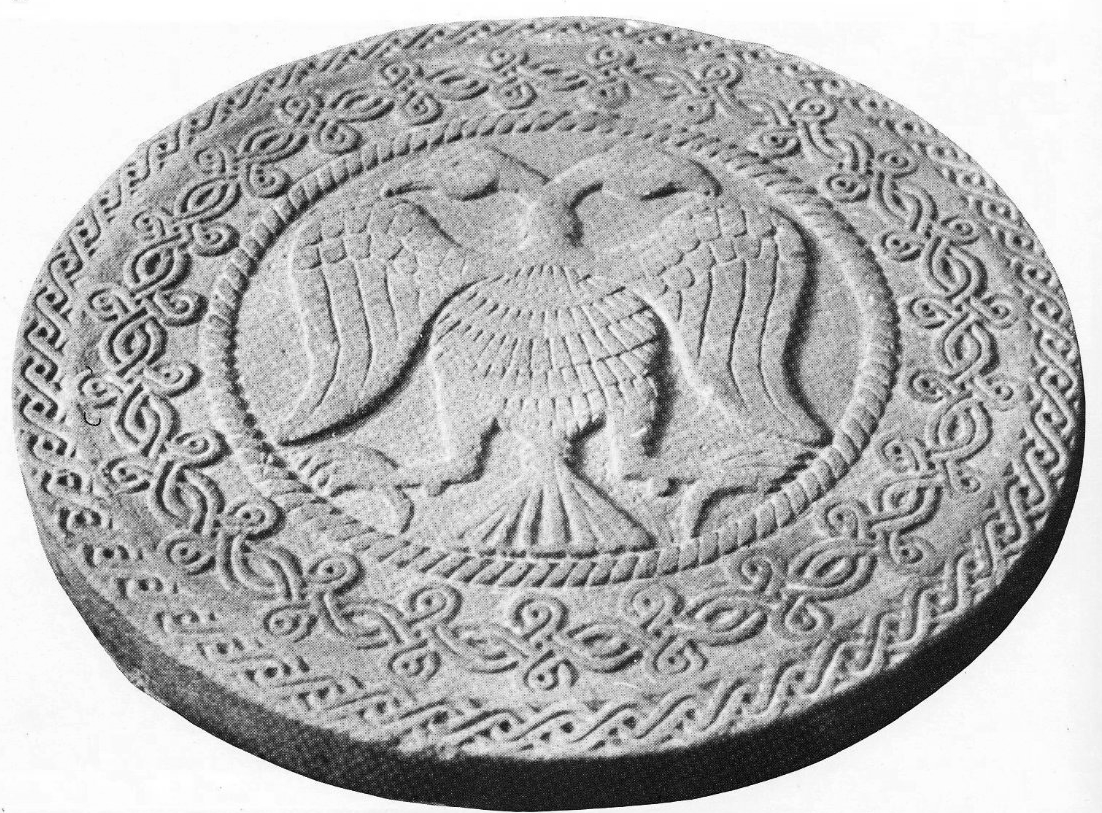
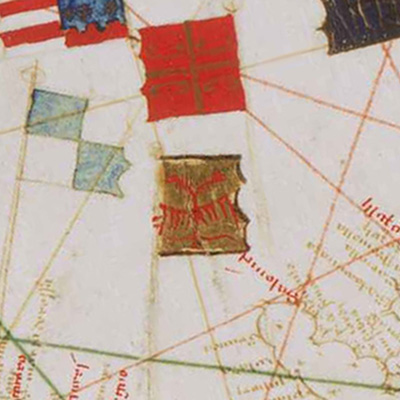
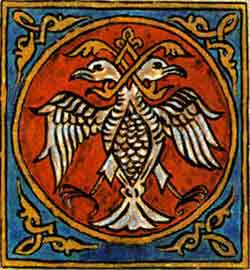
Left to Right: 1. Nemanjić Dynasty. 2. 12th c. in Serbian Orthodox Hilandar Monastery. 3. 13th c. in Žiča Monastery. 4. In Ljubostinja Monastery. 5. Serbian Eagle Flag and Serbian cross. 6. Serbian Prince Lazar Coat of Arms

In Serbia, the Serbian Orthodox Nemanjić dynasty adopted a double-headed eagle by the 12th century by Serbian prince Miroslav (later recorded by Angelino Dulcert 1339 during Serbian Empire). The double-headed eagle was used in several coats of arms found in the Illyrian Armorials, compiled in the early modern period. The white double-headed eagle on a red shield was used for the Serbian Kingdom Nemanjić dynasty, and the Despot Stefan Lazarević. A "Nemanjić eagle" was used at the crest of the Hrebeljanović (Lazarević dynasty), while a half-white half-red eagle was used at the crest of the Mrnjavčević. Use of the white eagle was continued by the modern Karađorđević and Obrenović ruling houses.

==== Albania ====
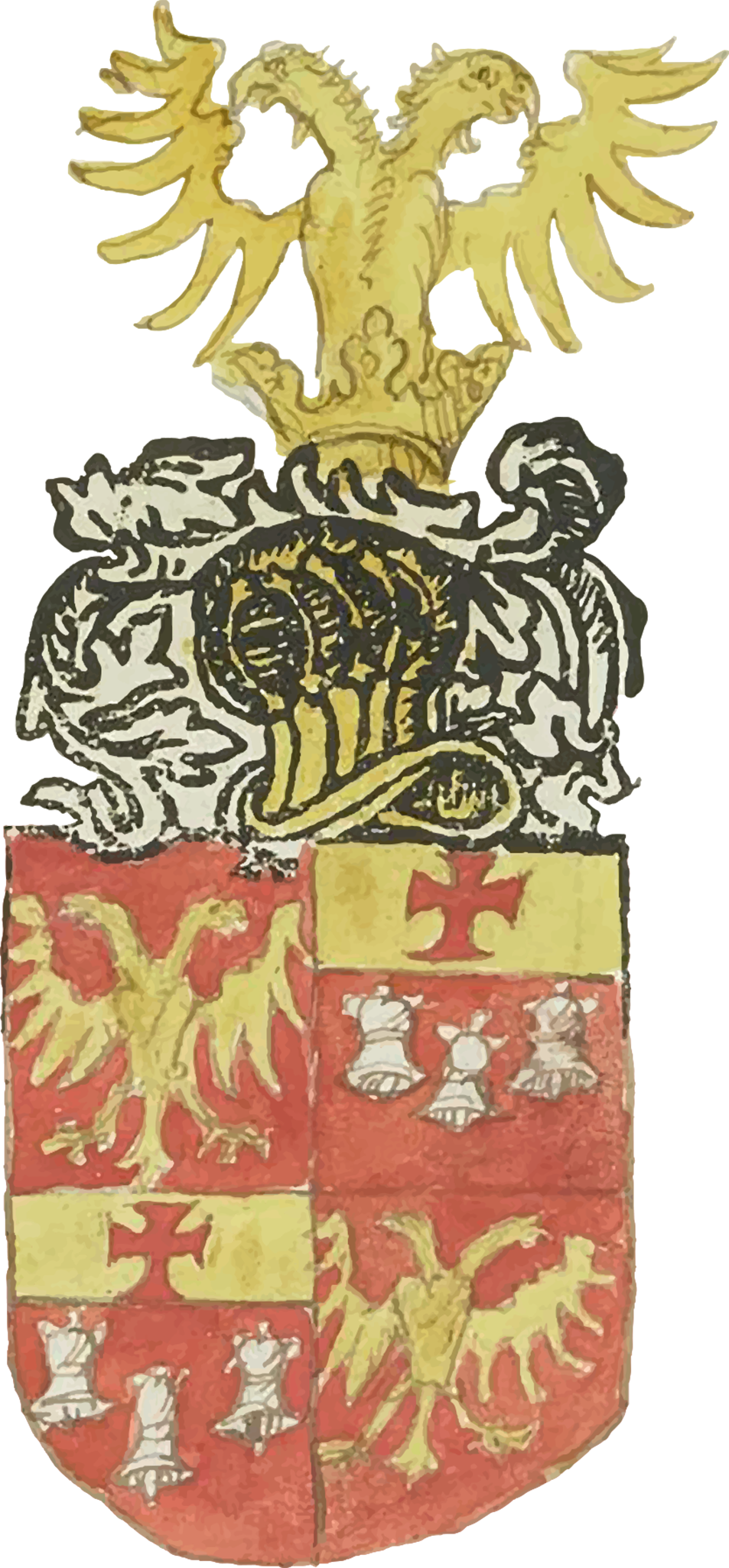
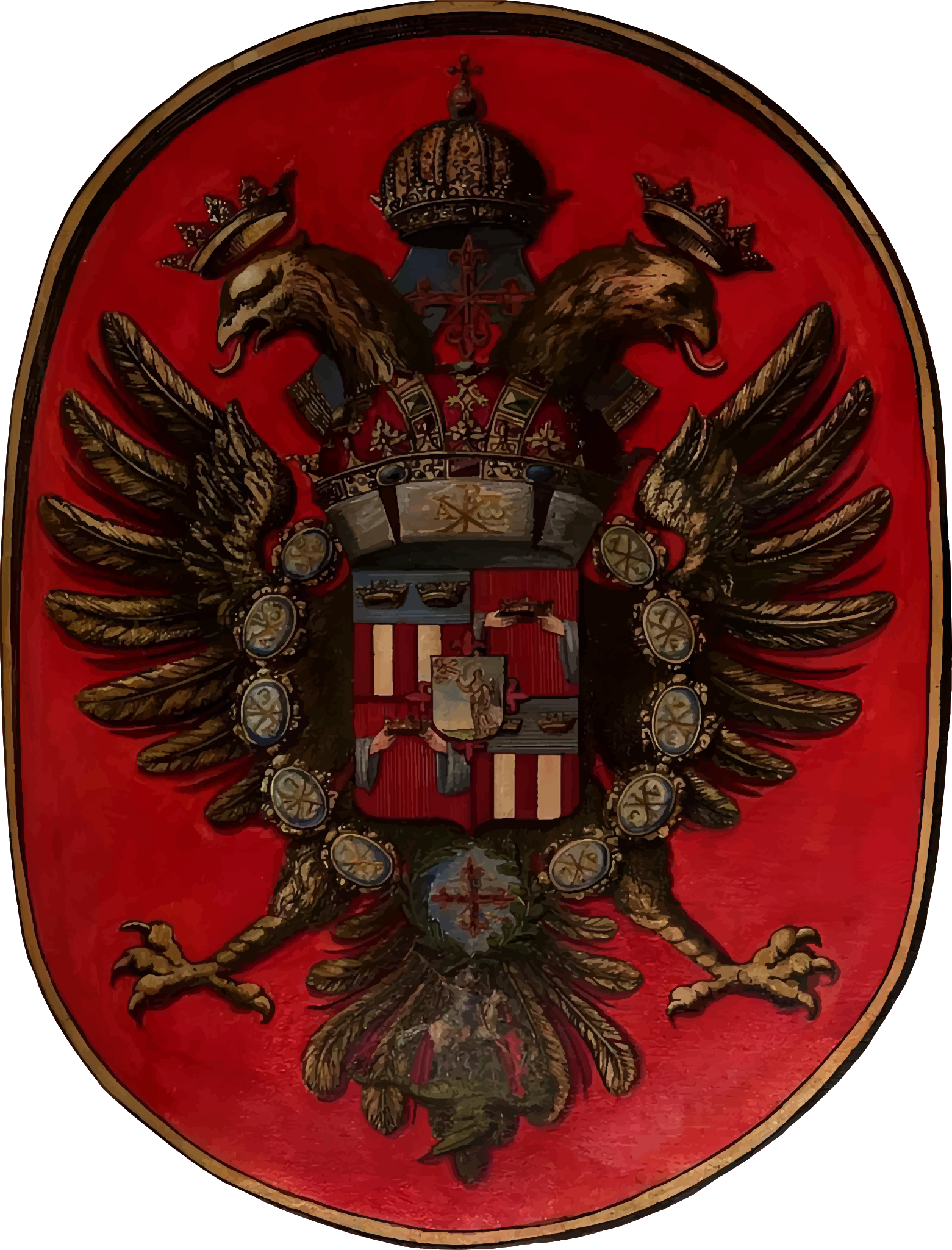
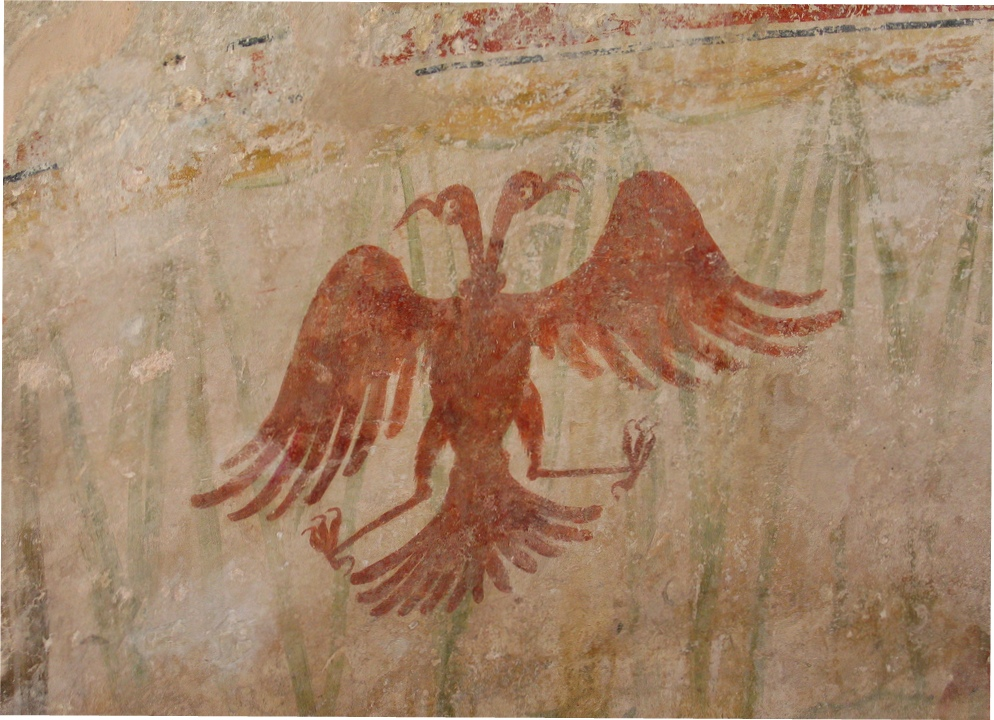
Left to Right: 1. Double-headed eagle on the official seal of Skanderbeg, the Lord of Albania (D • AL Dominus Albaniae). 2. Principality of Arianiti. 3. Engjëlli family. 4. In St. Anthony's Church 5. Dukagjini family. 6. Albanian General Gjergj Basta Coat of Arms

The double-headed eagle of Albania originates from the Byzantine Empire. The Kastrioti family in Albania adopted the double-headed eagle as their emblem in the 14th and 15th centuries. Some members of the Dukagjini family and the Arianiti family also used double-headed eagles, and a coalition of Albanian states in the 15th century, later called the League of Lezhë, also used the Kastrioti eagle as its flag. The current flag of Albania features a black two-headed eagle with a crimson background. During John Hunyadi's campaign in Niš in 1443, Skanderbeg and a few hundred Albanians defected from the Turkish ranks and used the double-headed eagle flag. The eagle was used for heraldic purposes in the Middle Ages by a number of Albanian noble families and became the symbol of the Albanians. The Kastrioti's coat of arms, depicting a black double-headed eagle on a red field, became famous when he led a revolt against the Ottoman Empire resulting in the independence of Albania from 1443 to 1479. This was the flag of the League of Lezhë, which was the first unified Albanian state in the Middle Ages and the oldest Parliament with extant records.

==== Russia ====
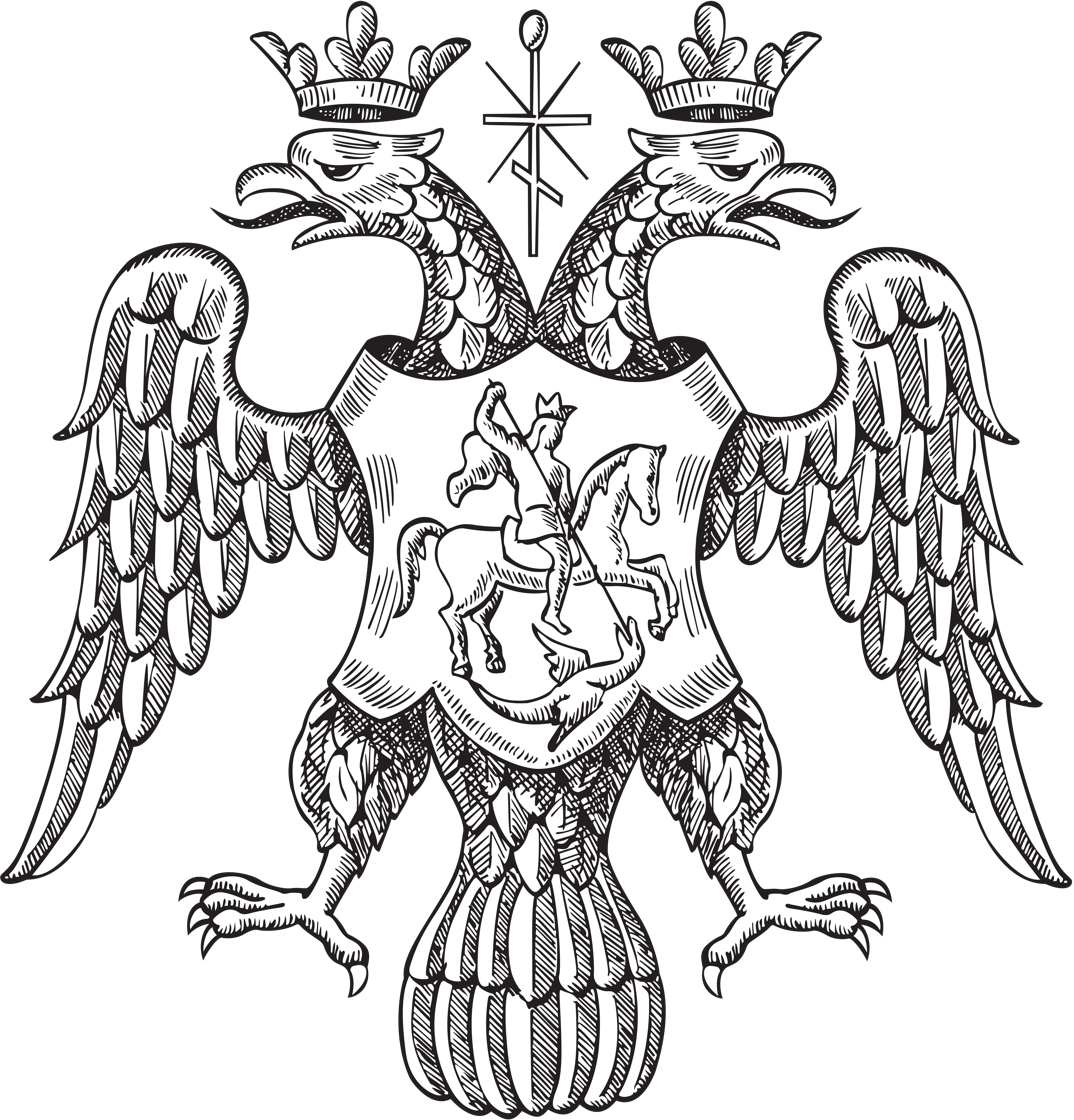
Coat of arms of Ivan the Terrible (1589)

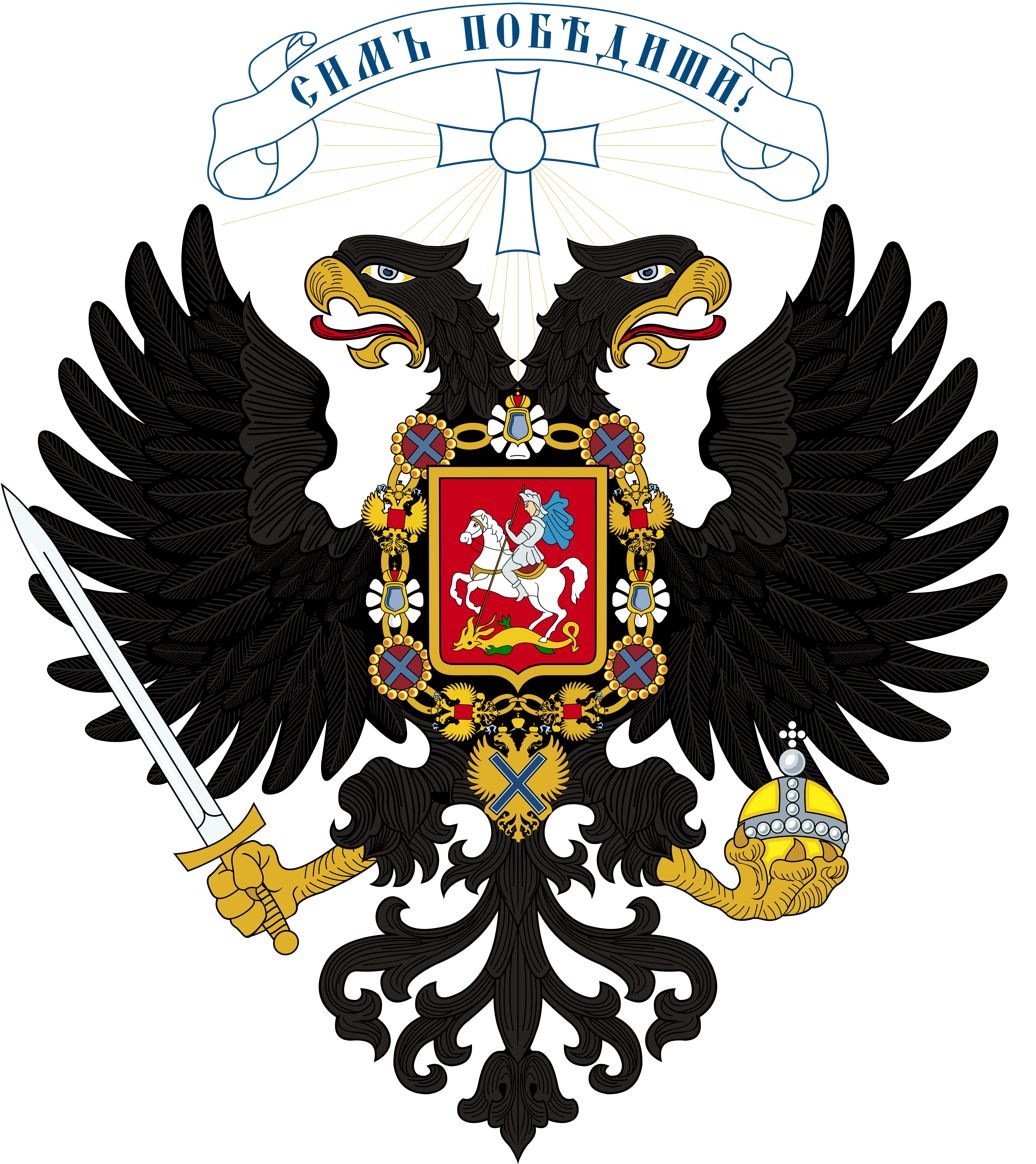
Coat of arms of the Kolchak Russian government (1918–1919)

After the fall of Constantinople, the use of two-headed eagle symbols spread to Grand Duchy of Moscow after Ivan III's second marriage (1472) to Zoe Palaiologina (a niece of the last Byzantine emperor Constantine XI Palaiologos, who reigned 1449–1453), The last prince of Tver, Mikhail III of Tver (1453–1505), was stamping his coins with two-headed eagle symbol. The double-headed eagle remained an important motif in the heraldry of the imperial families of Russia (the House of Romanov (1613–1762)).

The double-headed eagle was a main element of the coat of arms of the Russian Empire (1721–1917), modified in various ways from the reign of Ivan III (1462–1505) onwards, with the shape of the eagle getting its definite Russian form during the reign of Peter the Great (1682–1725). It continued to be used even after the start of the Russian Revolution in 1917 with its royal regalia (such as crowns, sceptre, and derzhava) removed, but was later abolished completely after the Bolsheviks who came to power later that year adopted a brand new non-traditional heraldry encompassing communist symbols. The White movement Russian government of 1918–1919 used it in their coat of arms. The double-headed eagle was restored in 1993 shortly after the fall of the Soviet Union and remains in use up to the present, although the eagle charge on the present coat of arms is golden rather than the traditional, imperial black. It is also widely used by federal agencies.

==== Holy Roman Empire ====
The Quaternion Eagle of the Holy Roman Empire c. 1510

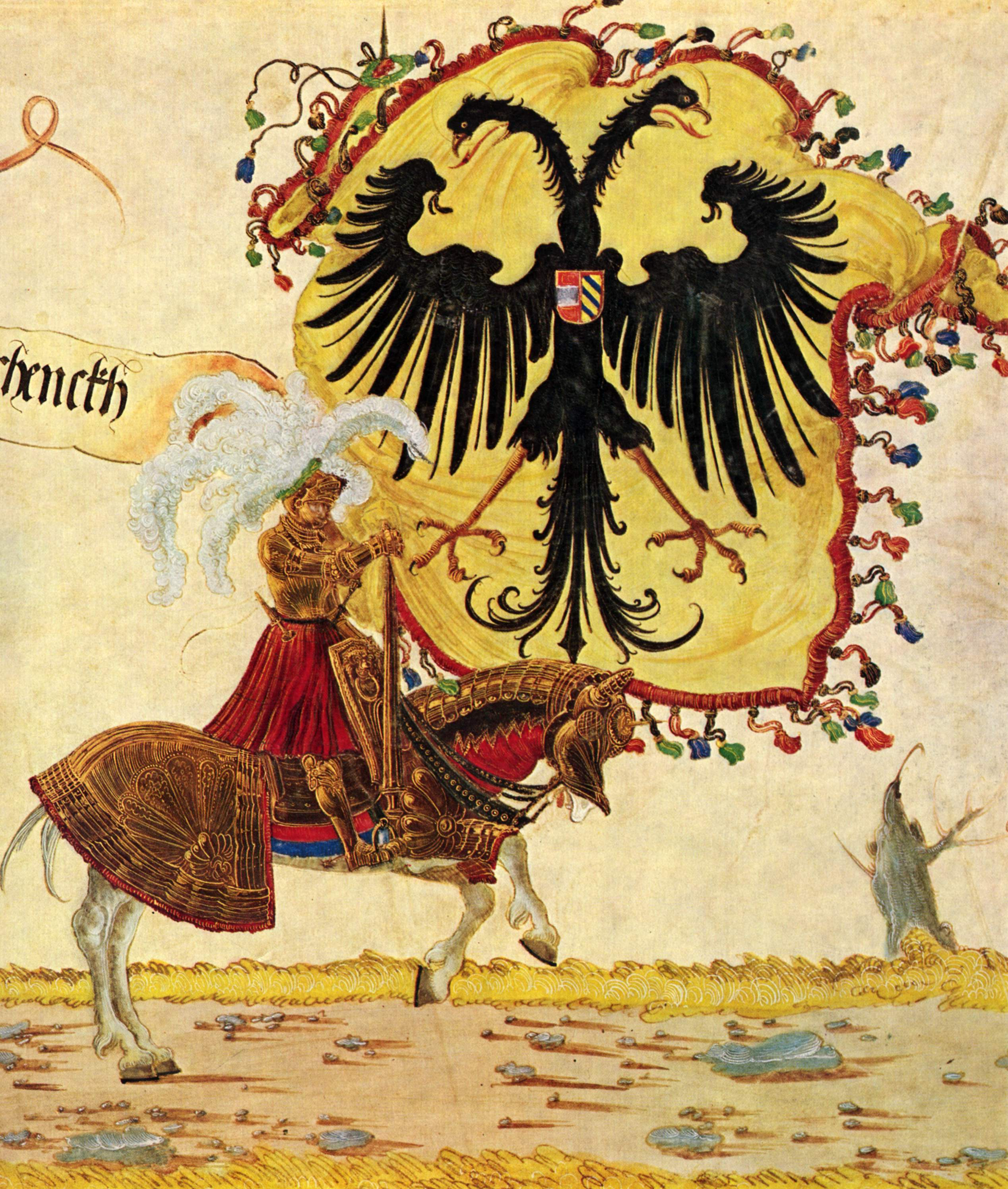
Emperor Maximilian with the Imperial Banner, c. 1515

Use of a double-headed Imperial Eagle, improved from the single-headed Imperial Eagle used in the high medieval period, became current in the 15th to 16th centuries. The double-headed Reichsadler was in the coats of arms of many German cities and aristocratic families in the early modern period. A distinguishing feature of the Holy Roman eagle was that it was often depicted with haloes. In the 16th century, the double-headed eagle was the most powerful heraldic mark up to that time, as it symbolized the union of the imperial dignity of the Holy Roman Empire (the Habsburg empire) with the Spanish Monarchy. The double-headed eagle would end up being the emblem of the Habsburgs in Madrid and Vienna, becoming universal with the global expansion of the Spanish Empire.

After the dissolution of the Holy Roman Empire in 1806, the double-headed eagle was retained by the Austrian Empire, and served also as the coat of arms of the German Confederation. The German states of Schwarzburg-Rudolstadt and Schwarzburg-Sondershausen continued to use the double-headed eagle as well until they were abolished shortly after the First World War, and so did the Free City of Lübeck until it was abolished by the Nazi government in 1937. Austria, which switched to a single-headed eagle after the end of the monarchy, briefly used a double-headed eagle – with haloes – once again when it was a one-party state 1934–1938; this, too, was ended by the Nazi government. Since then, Germany and Austria, and their respective states, have not used double-headed eagles.

==== Mysore (India) ====
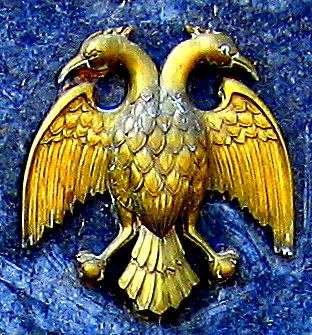
Kingdom of Mysore

The Gandaberunda is a bicephalous bird, not necessarily an eagle but very similar in design to the double-headed eagle used in Western heraldry, used as a symbol by the Wadiyar dynasty of the Kingdom of Mysore from the 16th century. Coins (gold pagoda or gadyana) from the rule of Achyuta Deva Raya (reigned 1529–1542) depicted the Gandaberunda. Of similar age is a sculpture on the roof of the Rameshwara temple in the temple town of Keladi in Shivamogga. The symbol was in continued use by the Maharaja of Mysore into the modern period, and was adopted as the state symbol of the State of Mysore (now Karnataka) after Indian independence.

=== Modern use ===
Albania, Serbia, Montenegro and Russia each have a double-headed eagle in their respective coats of arms. In 1912, Ismail Qemali raised a similar version of that flag. The flag has gone through many alterations, until 1992 when the current flag of Albania was introduced.

The double-headed eagle is now used as an emblem by a number of Orthodox Christian churches, including the Greek Orthodox Church and the Orthodox Autocephalous Church of Albania. In modern Greece, it appears in official use in the Hellenic Army (coat of arms of Hellenic Army General Staff) and the Hellenic Army XVI Infantry Division,

The two-headed eagle appears, often as a supporter, on the modern and historical arms and flags of Austria-Hungary, the Kingdom of Yugoslavia, Austria (1934–1938), Albania, Armenia, Montenegro, Russia and Serbia. It was also used as a charge on the Greek coat of arms for a brief period in 1925–1926. It is also used in the municipal arms of a number of cities in Germany, Netherlands and Serbia, the arms and flag of the city and province of Toledo, Spain, the arms of the town of Velletri, Italy, and the arms and flag of the city of Rijeka, Croatia.

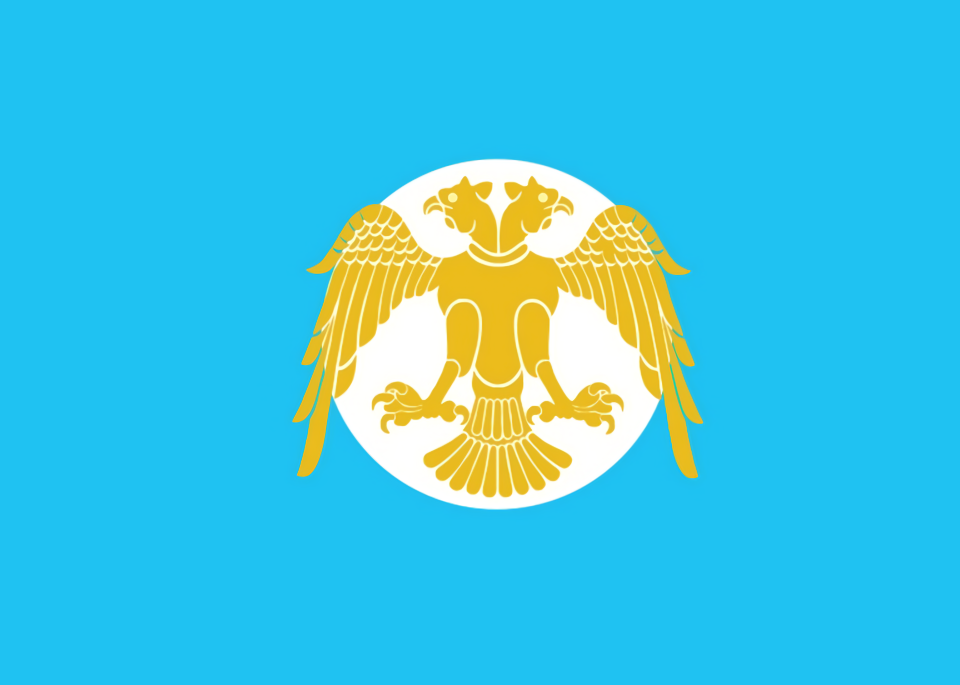
Flag of Syrian Turkmen

An English heraldic tradition, apparently going back to the 17th century, attributes coats of arms with double-headed eagles to the Anglo-Saxon earls of Mercia, Leofwine and Leofric. The design was introduced in a number of British municipal coats of arms in the 20th century, such as the Municipal Borough of Wimbledon in London, the supporters in the coat of arms of the city and burgh of Perth, and hence in that of the district of Perth and Kinross (1975). The motif is also found in a number of British family coats of arms. In Turkey, General Directorate of Security, and the municipalities of Diyarbakır and Konya - to name a few - have a double-headed eagle in their coat of arms.

==== Scottish Rite of Freemasonry ====
The Double-Headed Eagle is used as an emblem by the Scottish Rite of Freemasonry which was introduced in France, in the early 1760s, as the emblem of the Kadosh degree. The Ancient and Accepted Scottish Rite of Freemasonry, adopted the 'Double Headed Eagle of Lagash' as its emblem since the 1758 establishment of the Masonic Chivalry Rite (Council of Emperors of the East and West), in Paris, France. That council, with a Masonic rite of twenty-five degrees, set the foundation for what would evolve into the present masonic system Scottish Rite. The successors of the "Council of Emperors of the East and West" are today the various Supreme Councils of the Thirty Third Degree in more than 60 countries. The Double Headed Eagle was formally adopted from the personal emblem of King Frederick the Great, of Prussia, who in 1786 became the First Sovereign Grand Commander of the Supreme Council of the 33 Degree, subsequent to its formation following the adoption of eight additional degrees to the Masonic Rite.

==== Sports clubs insignia ====
Several sports clubs, mainly Greek and Turkish, have the double-headed eagle in their insignia. Some of them are: three football clubs of Turkey; Çorum FK, Erzurumspor FK, Konyaspor, Amed SFK and the Greek sport clubs AEK (Athletic Union of Constantinople) and (since 1929 when it adopted the emblem of its parent association Enosis Konstantinopoliton Thessalonikis which was founded in 1923) P.A.O.K. (Pan-Thesalonian Athletic Club of Constantinopolitans). The Greek clubs use this symbol since both were founded by Greek refugees who moved to Greece from Constantinople in the 1920s. It is also the emblem of the Dutch clubs NEC and Vitesse Arnhem, the English football club AFC Wimbledon and Scottish side Saint Johnstone FC. The Gandabherunda insignia is used by the Indian club Bengaluru FC in their logo.

== Gallery ==
=== Heraldry and vexillology ===
Imperial Banner of the Holy Roman Empire, modern re-creation

Greater coat of arms of Charles V, Holy Roman Emperor and King of Spain

Coat of arms of Frederick Augustus II, Elector of Saxony

1776 proposal for the Great Seal of the United States with a double-headed eagle as the symbol for German Americans

Coat of arms of the Antwerp Province, Belgium. A banner of arms is also depicted in the Greater coat of arms of Belgium

Coat of arms of Ninove, Belgium

Coat of arms of Perth, Scotland

Coat of arms of the Austrian Empire (1815–1867)

Kingdom of Lombardy–Venetia (1815–1866), a crown land of the Austrian Empire

Coat of arms of Groningen, The Netherlands (1819–)

Coat of arms of the Federal State of Austria (1934–1938)

Coat of arms of Serbia (1882–1918; 2004–)

Arms of the Cantacuzino family in the Kingdom of Romania (c. 1900)

Coat of arms of Albania (1998–)

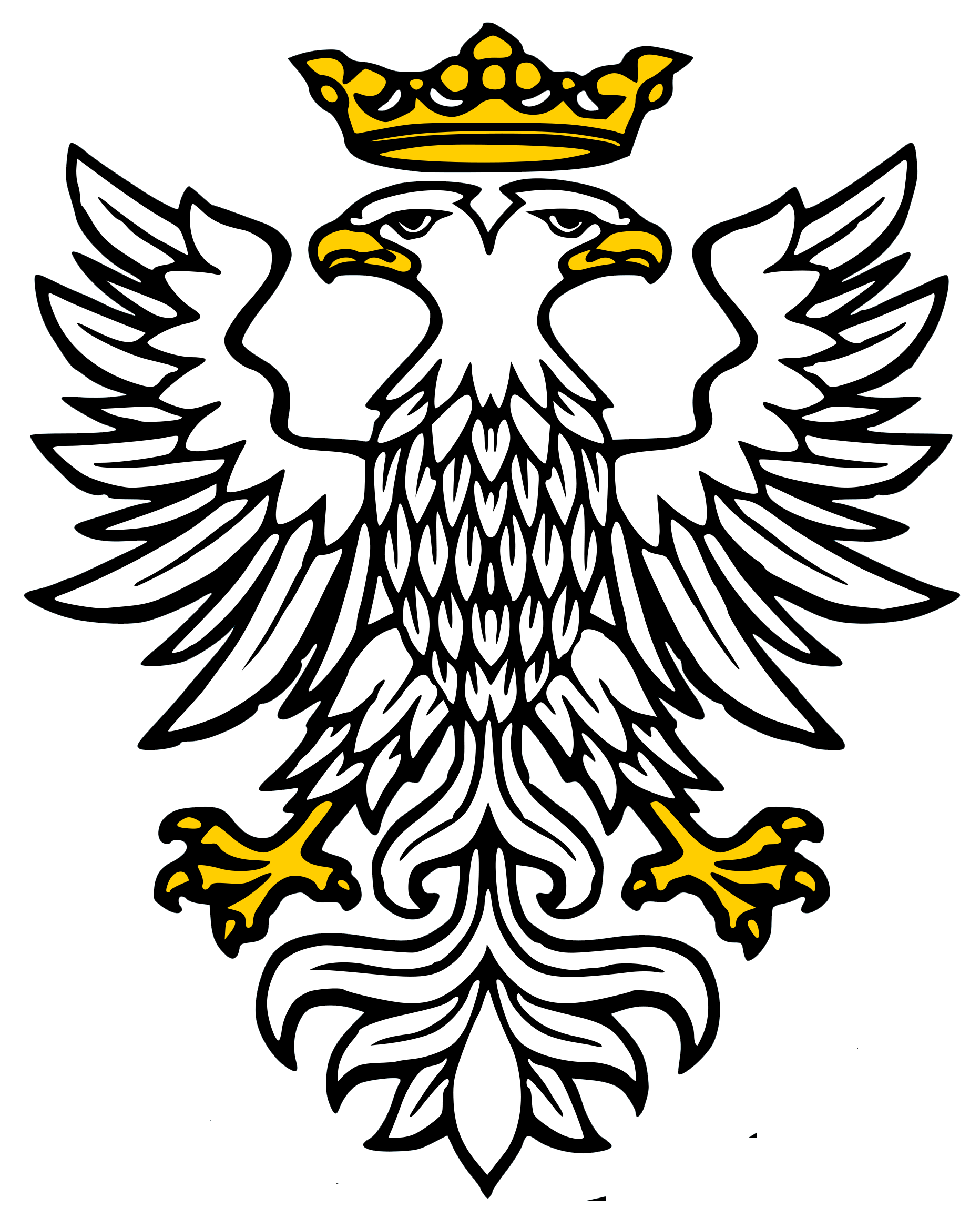
Badge of the Mercian Brigade (1948–64) and current badge of the Mercian Regiment reformed in 2007

Coat of arms of Karnataka, India

Flag used by the Greek Orthodox Church and Mount Athos since the later 20th century

Coat of arms of the Russian Empire

Coat of arms of Armenia (1992–) with a double-headed eagle on the second quarter as the symbol for the Artaxiad and Arsacid dynasties

Coat of arms of the Russian Federation (1993–)

Coat of arms of Lübeck (1997–)

Coat of arms of Chernihiv Oblast, Ukraine (2000–)

Coat of arms of Montenegro (2004–)

Coat of arms of the 1st-54 Regulares Battalion "Tetuán" (Spanish Army)

Coat of arms of Potosi, Bolivia

Double-headed eagle used by the Empire under the Palaiologos Dynasty

Emblem used by the Seljuk Sultanate of Rûm

=== Artwork ===
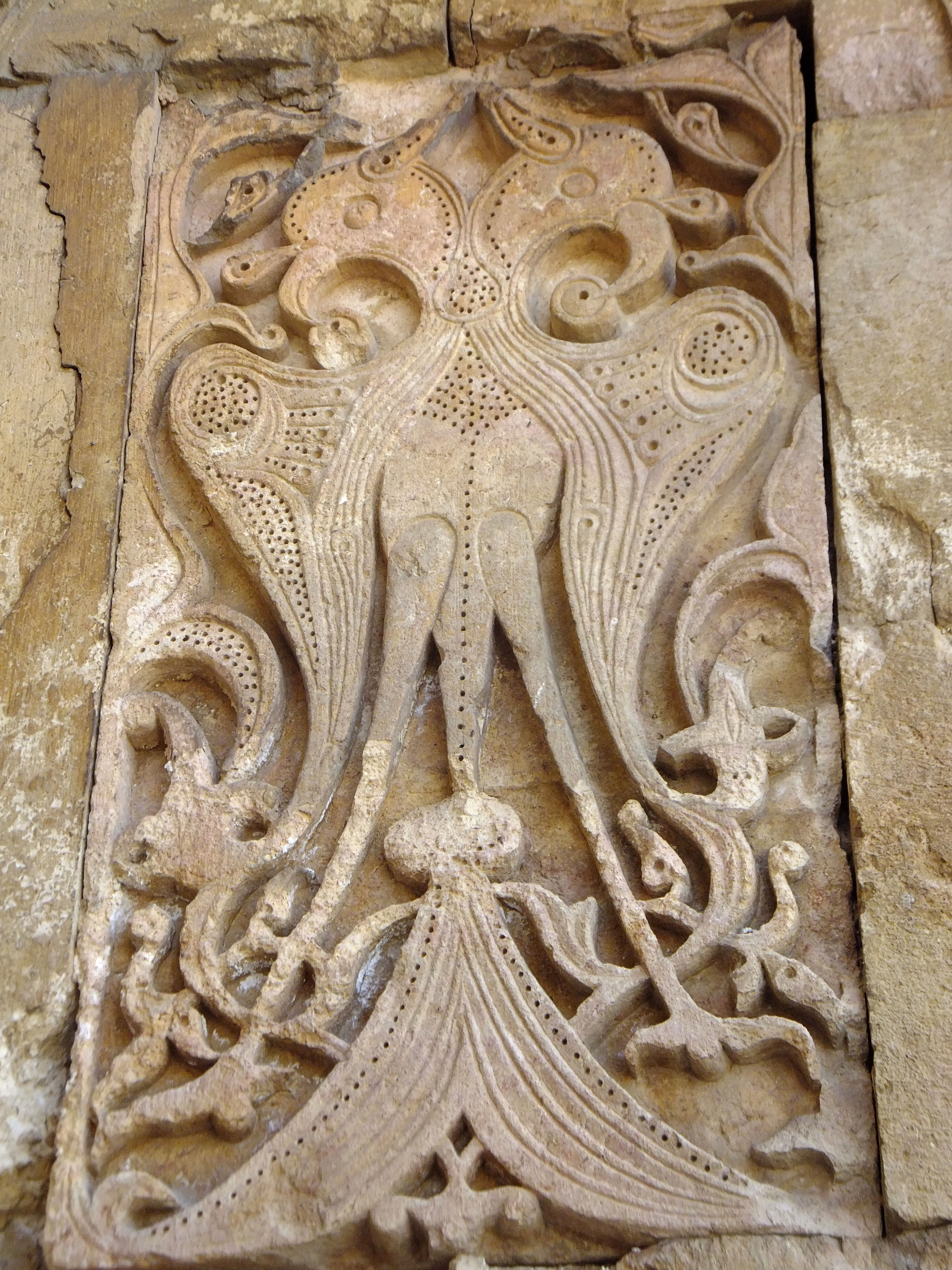
A double-headed eagle relief, 13th century, Divriği Great Mosque and Hospital, Sivas Province

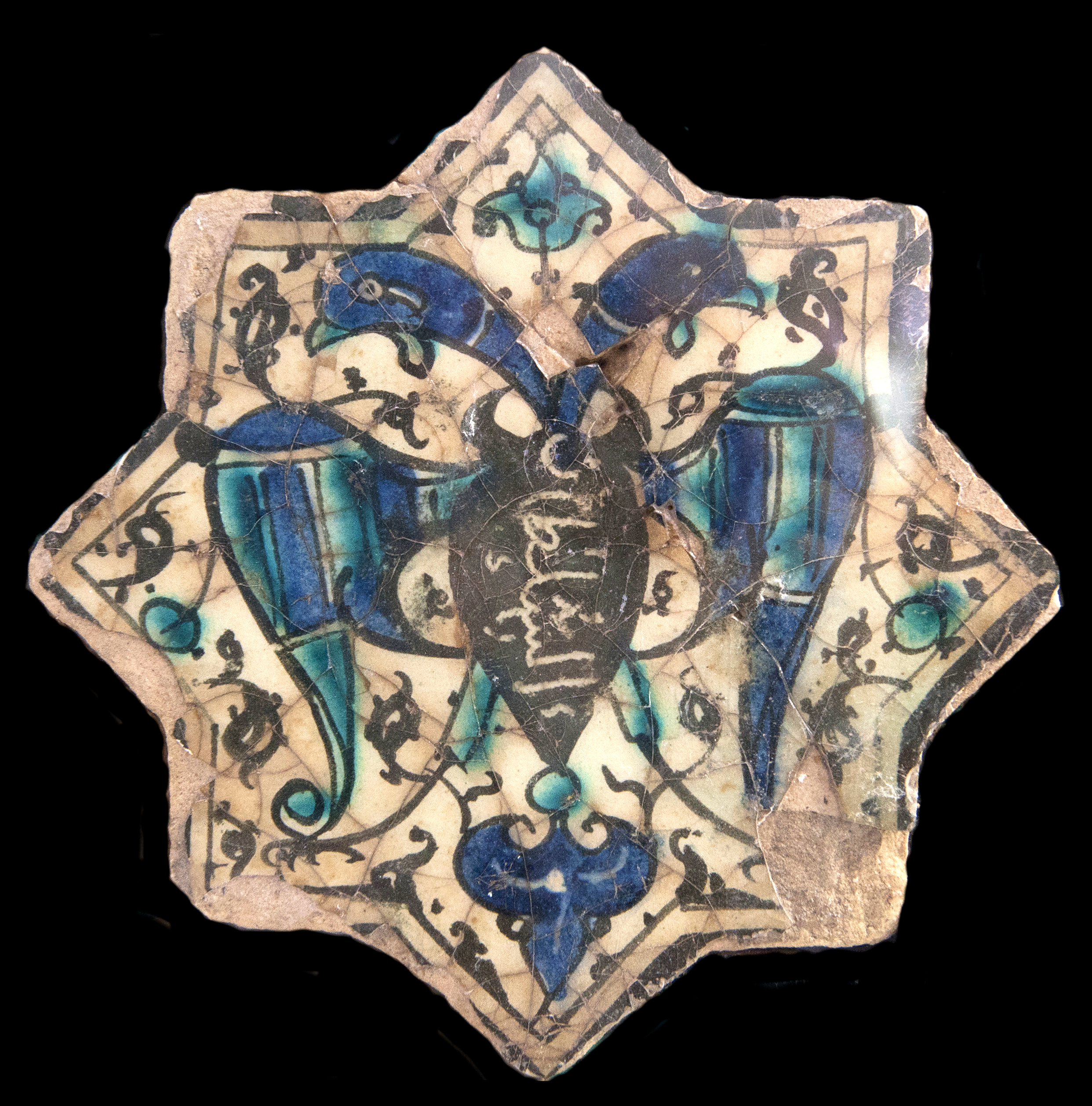
Double-headed eagle, with "al-Sultan" inscription on the chest. Kubadabad Palace, Türkiye, 1220s.

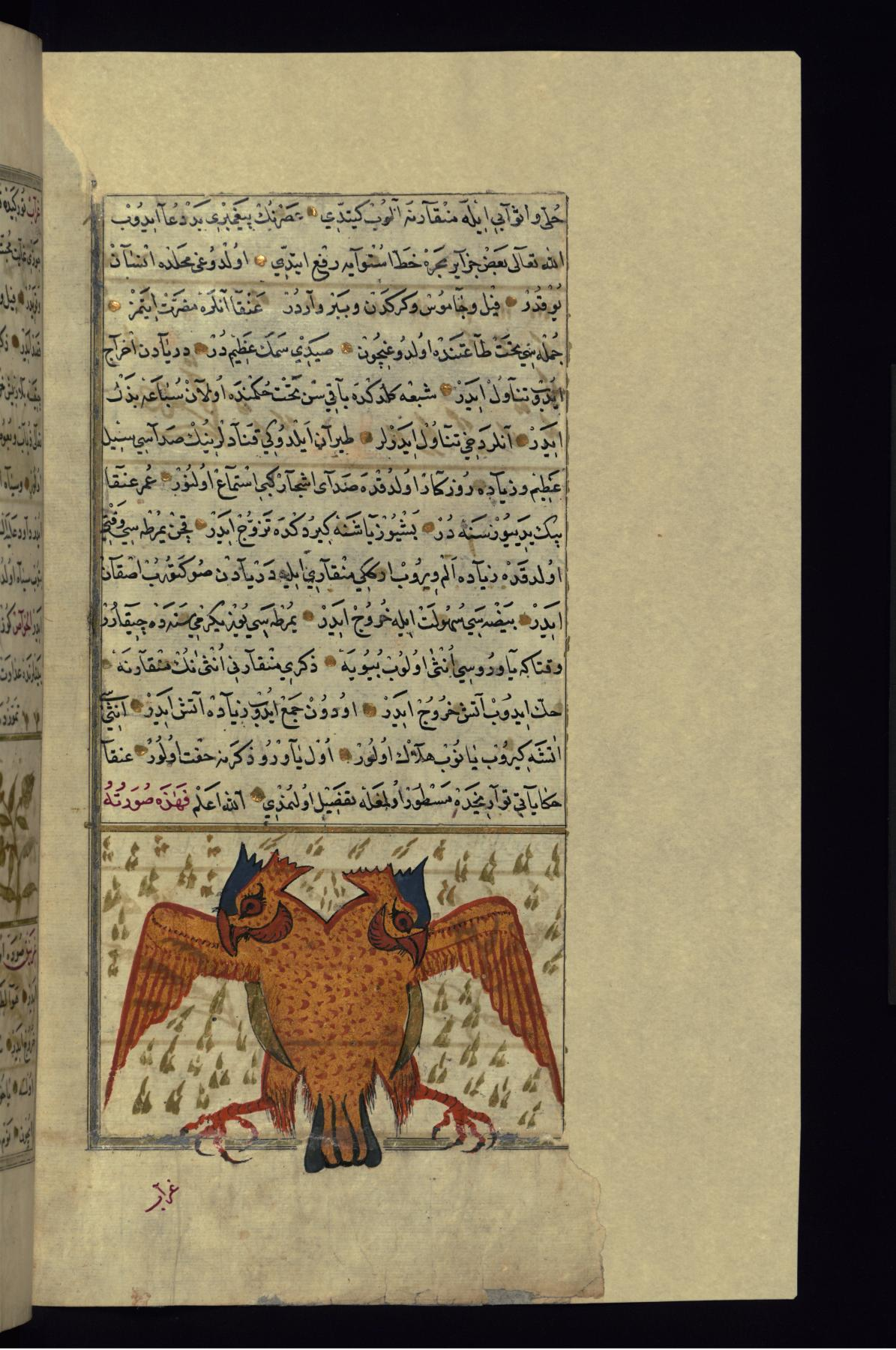
A depiction of an Anqa, 1717 AD (1121 AH), Ottoman Empire

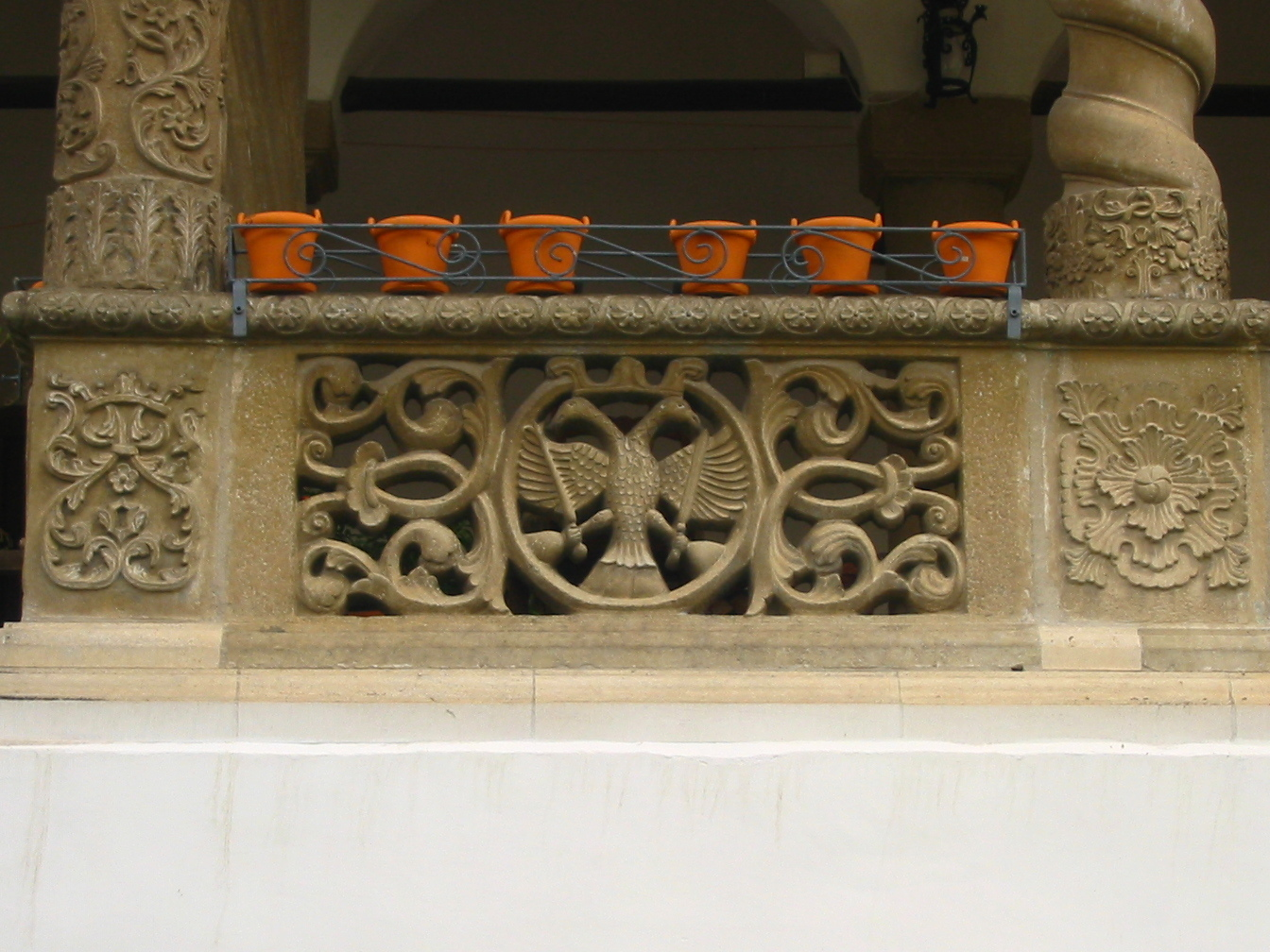
Double-headed eagle sculpture of a railing of the Horezu Monastery, Horezu, Romania, unknown architect or sculptor, 17th-18th centuries

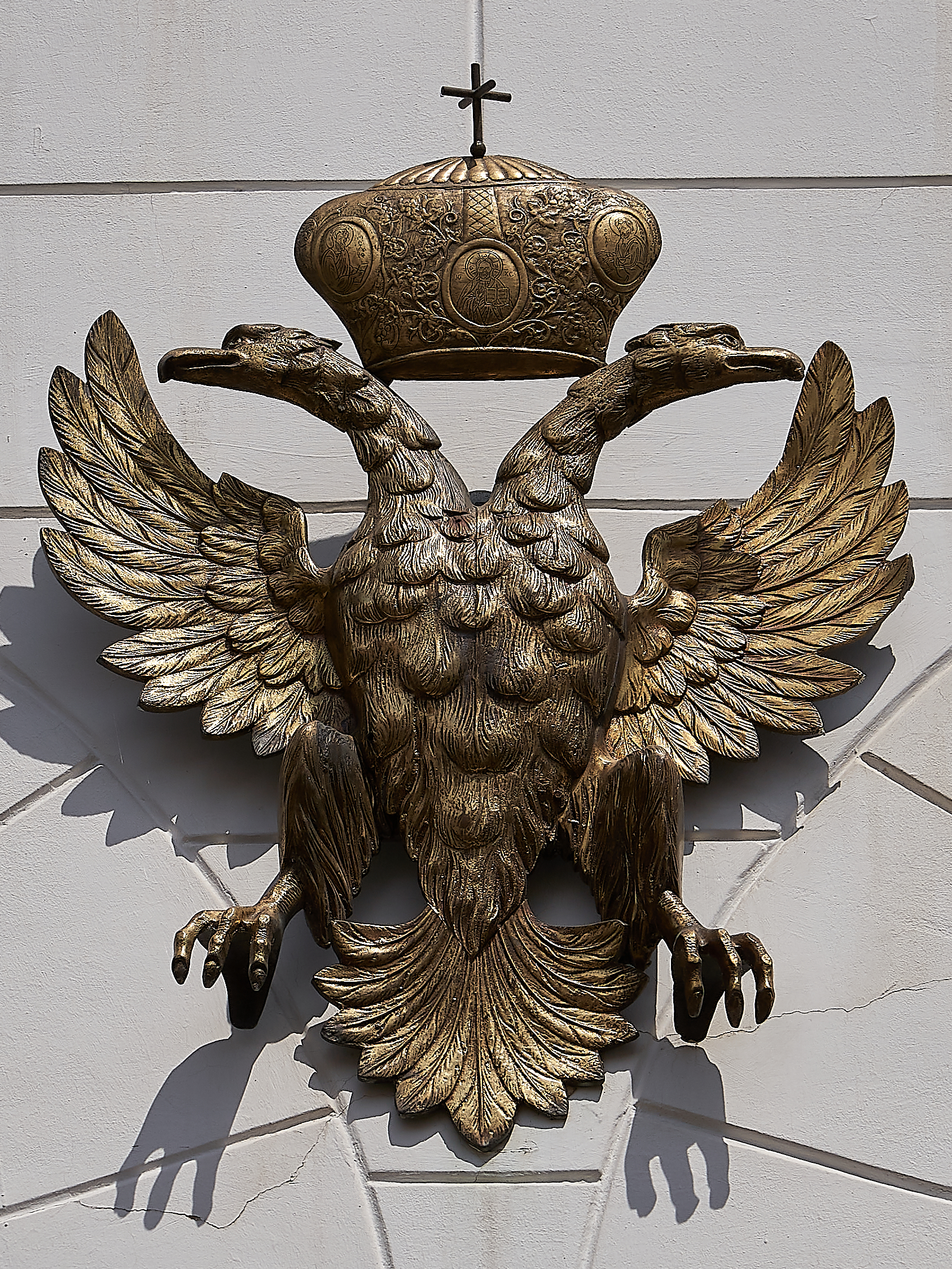
Sculpture of double-headed eagle on the Seat of the Archbishopric of Athens

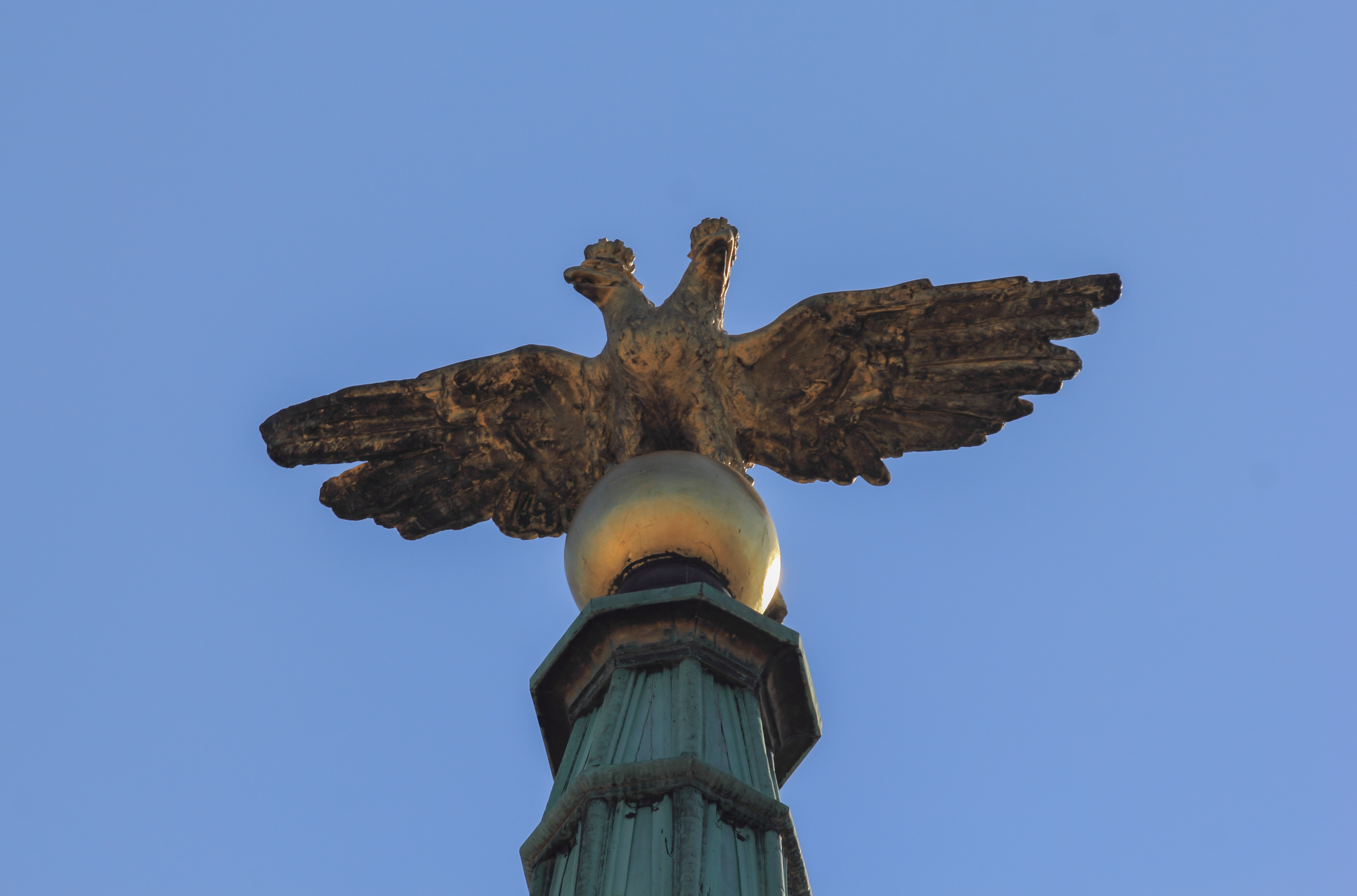
Sculpture of double-headed eagle on the top of Stari Dvor, Belgrade

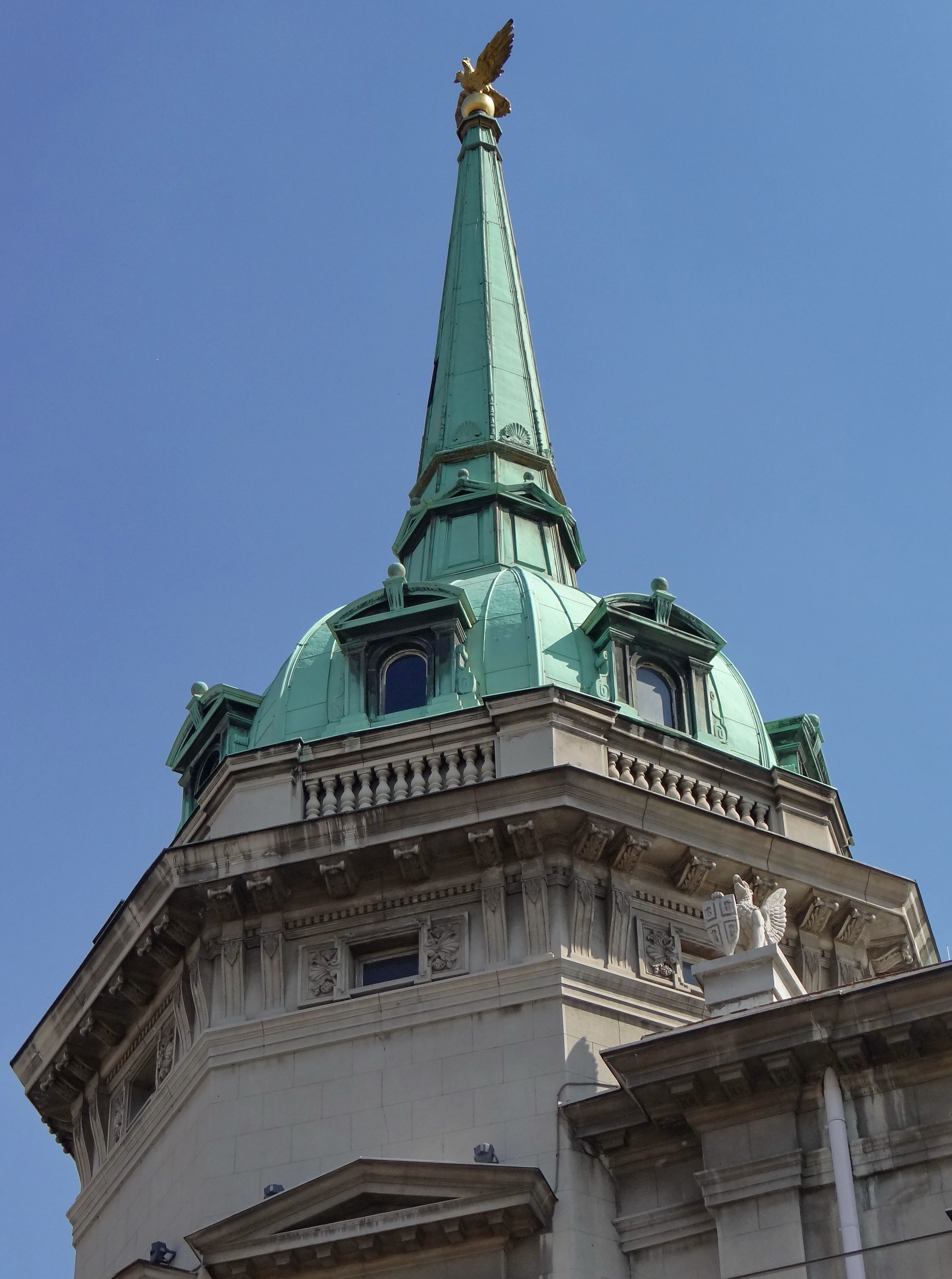
Sculpture of double-headed eagle on the top of Novi Dvor, Belgrade

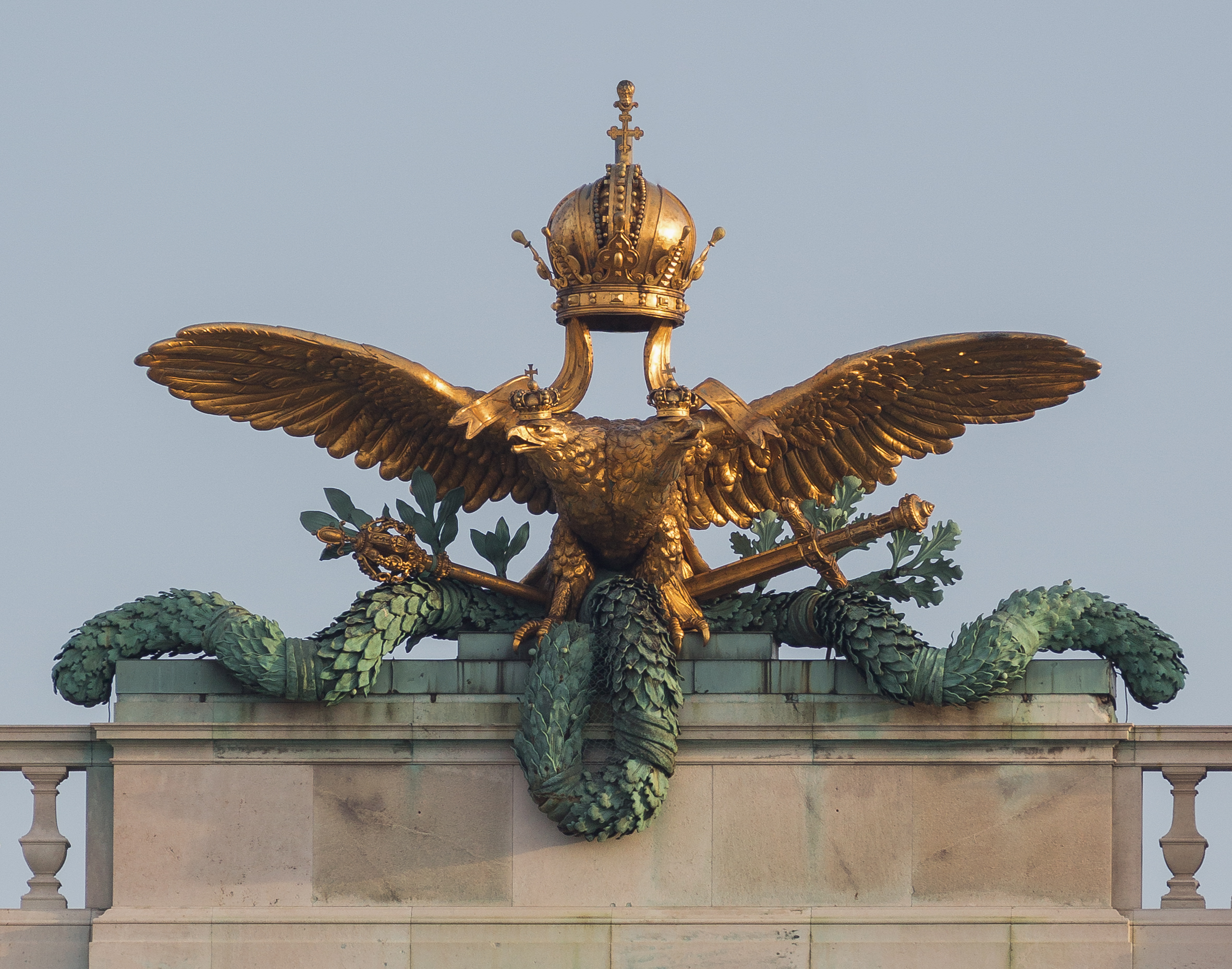
Sculpture of double-headed eagle on the top of Hofburg, Vienna

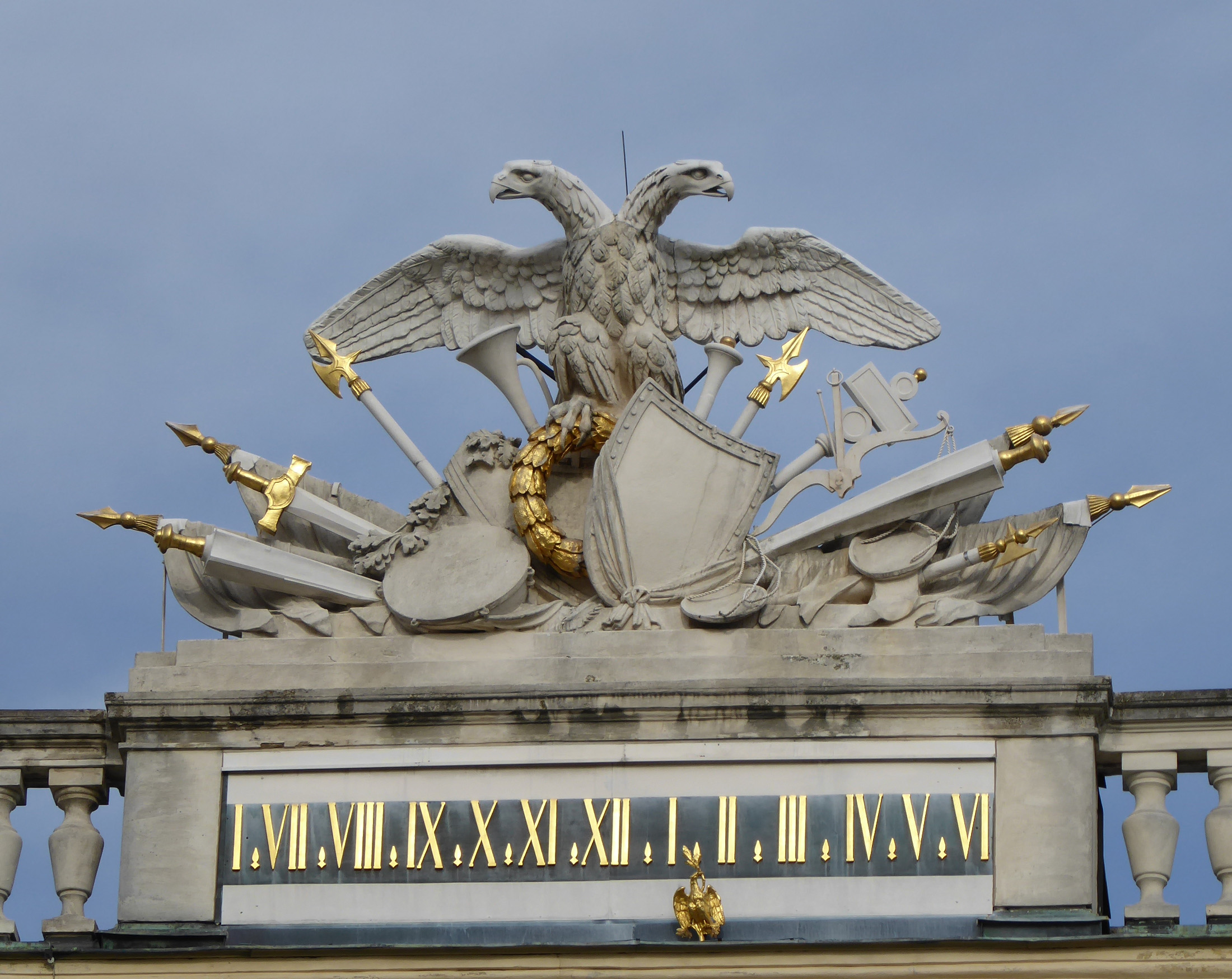
Sculpture of double-headed eagle on the top of Schönbrunn Palace, Vienna

Sculpture of double-headed eagle on the top of Regierungsgebäude, Vienna

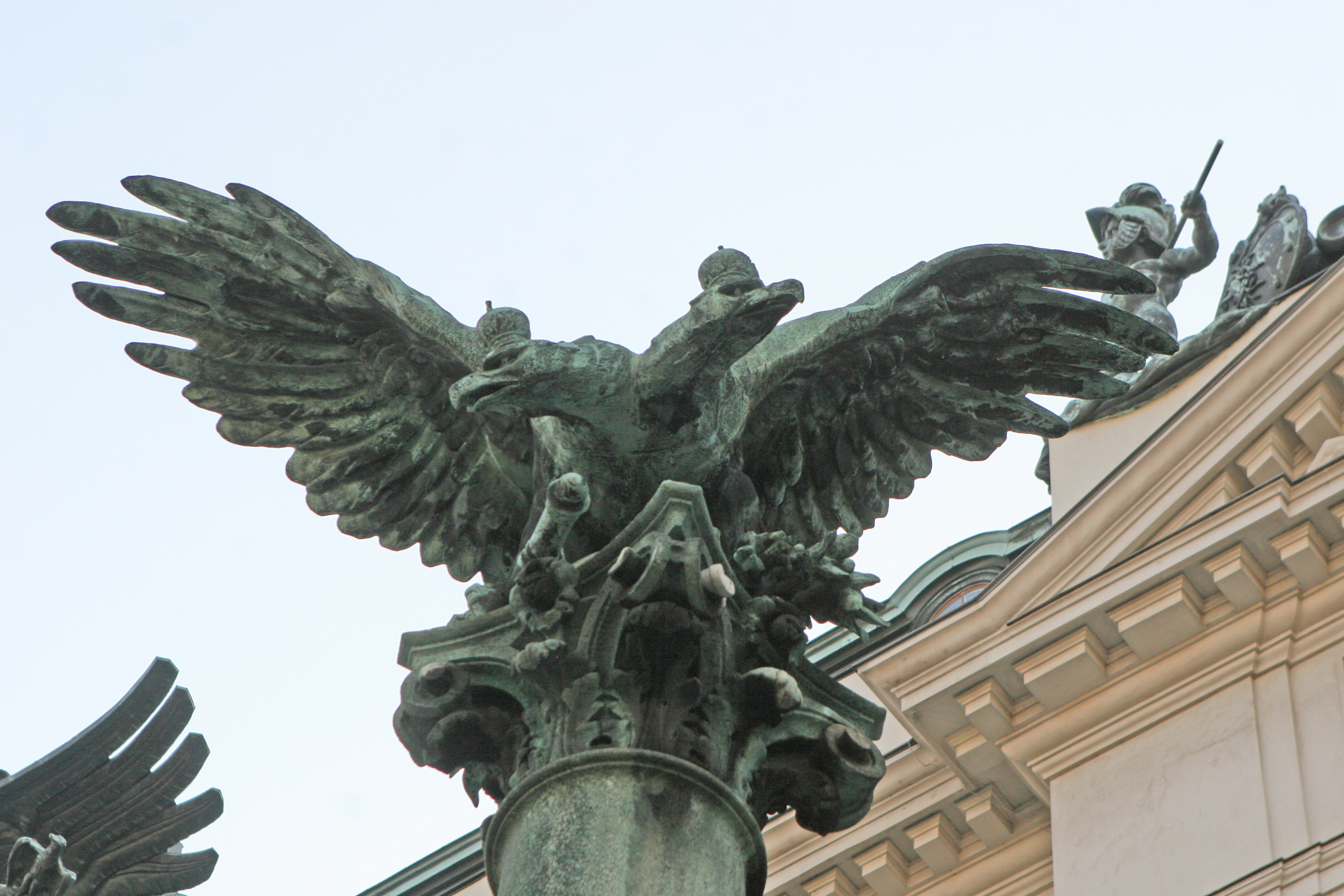
Sculpture of double-headed eagle on the top of Ministerienbrunnen, Vienna

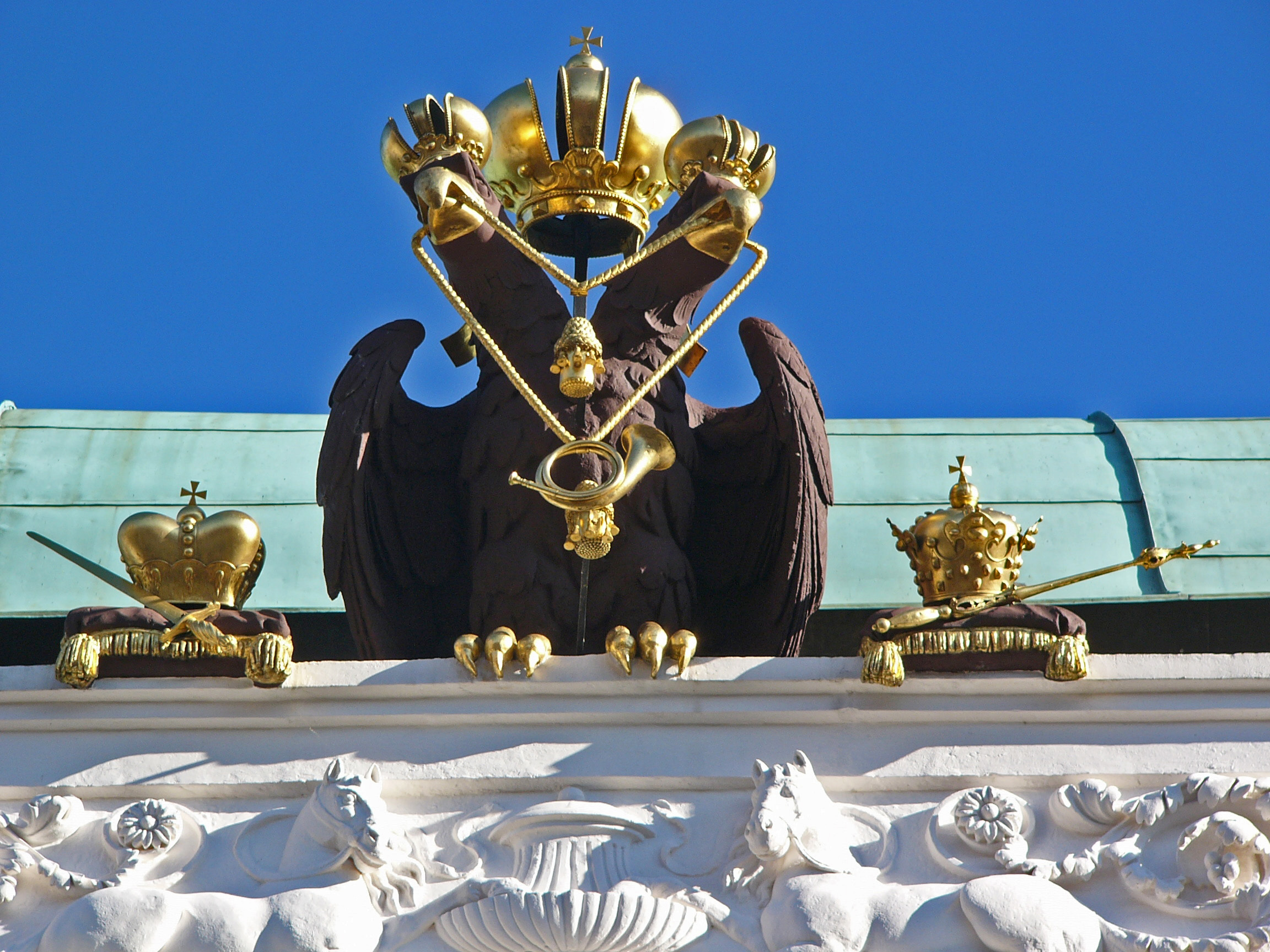
Sculpture of double-headed eagle on the top of Old Post Office, Melk

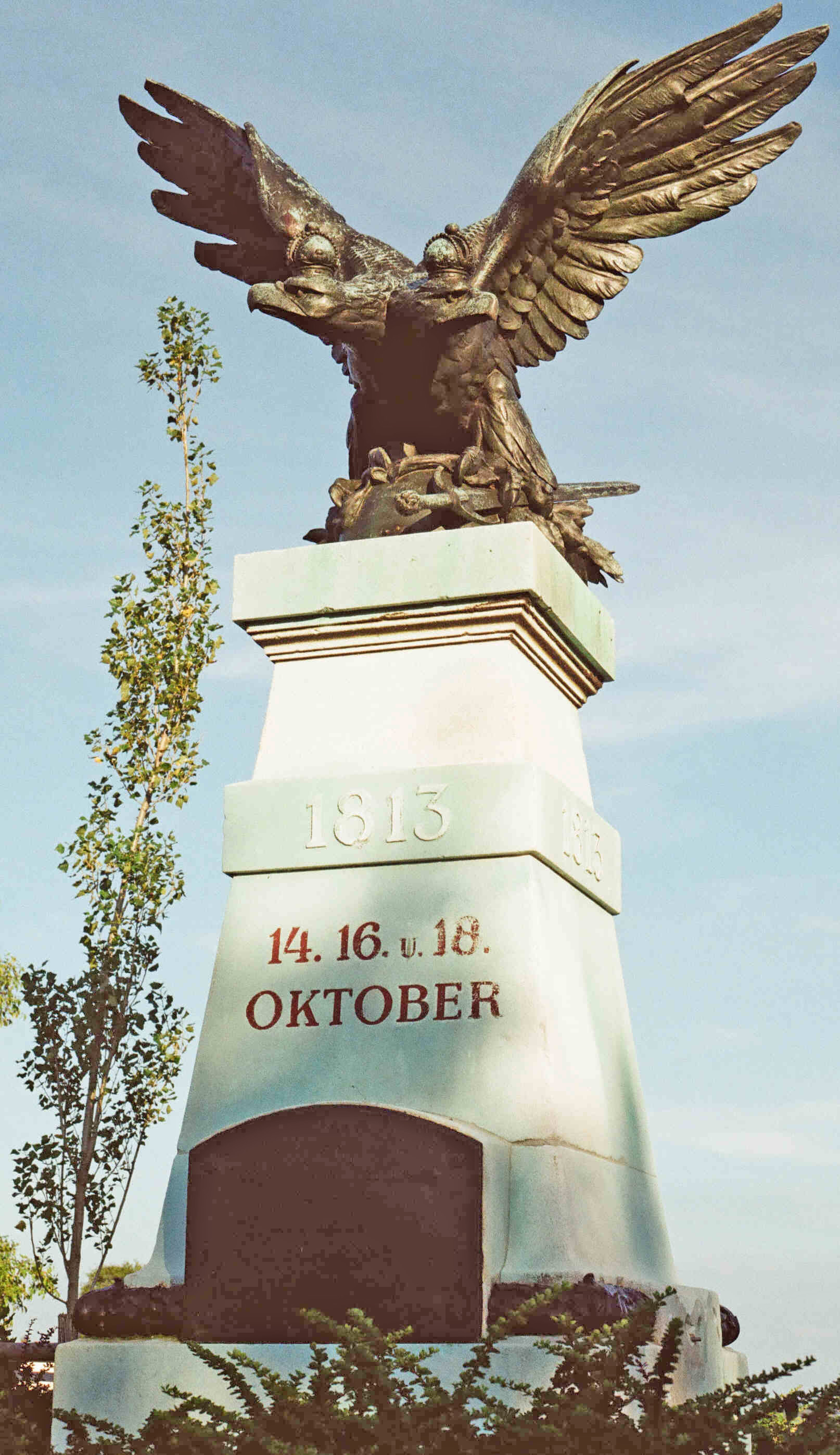
Sculpture of double-headed eagle on the top of an Austrian Monument in Leipzig

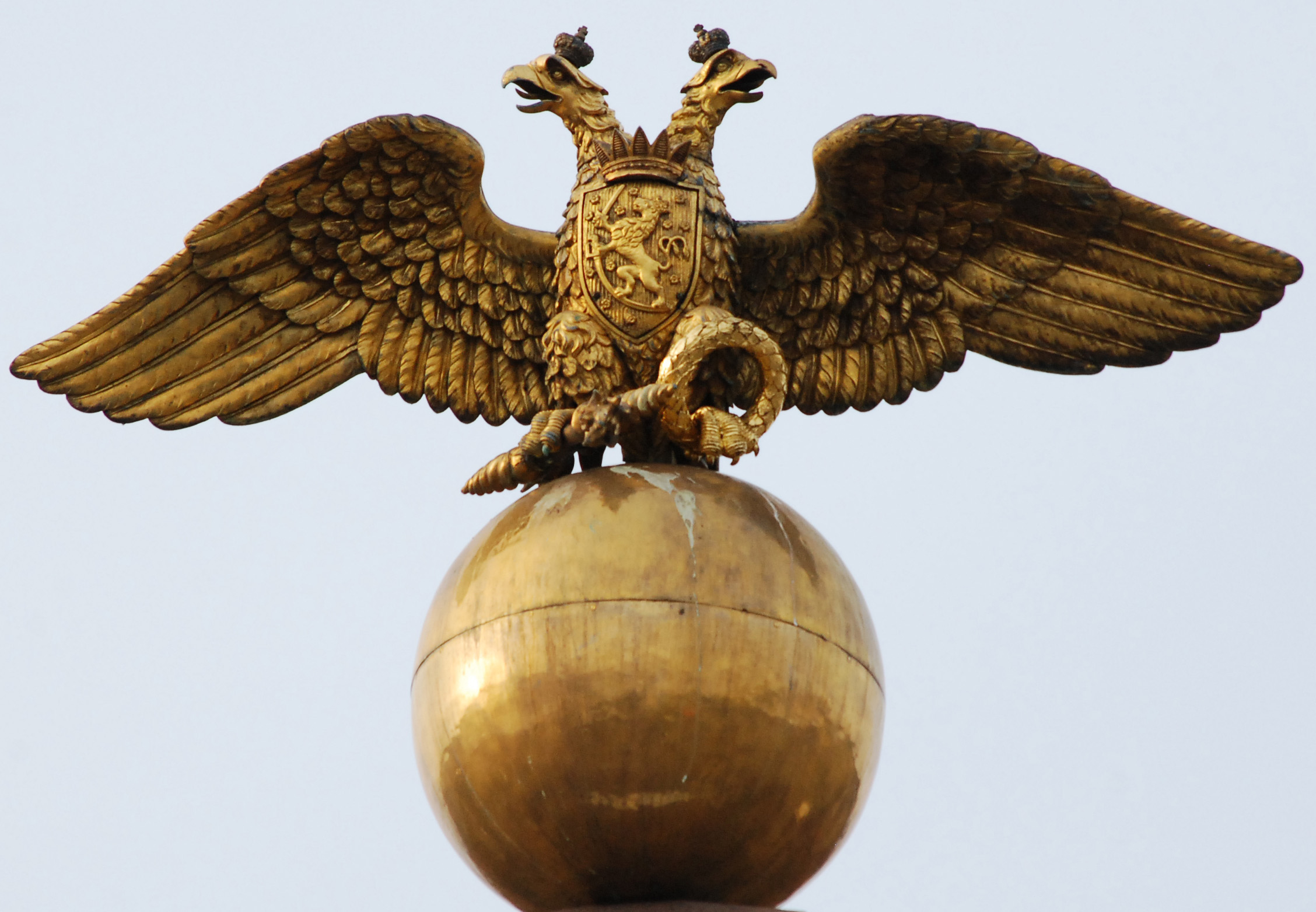
Sculpture of double-headed eagle on the top of the Stone of the Empress, which located at the Market Square, Helsinki

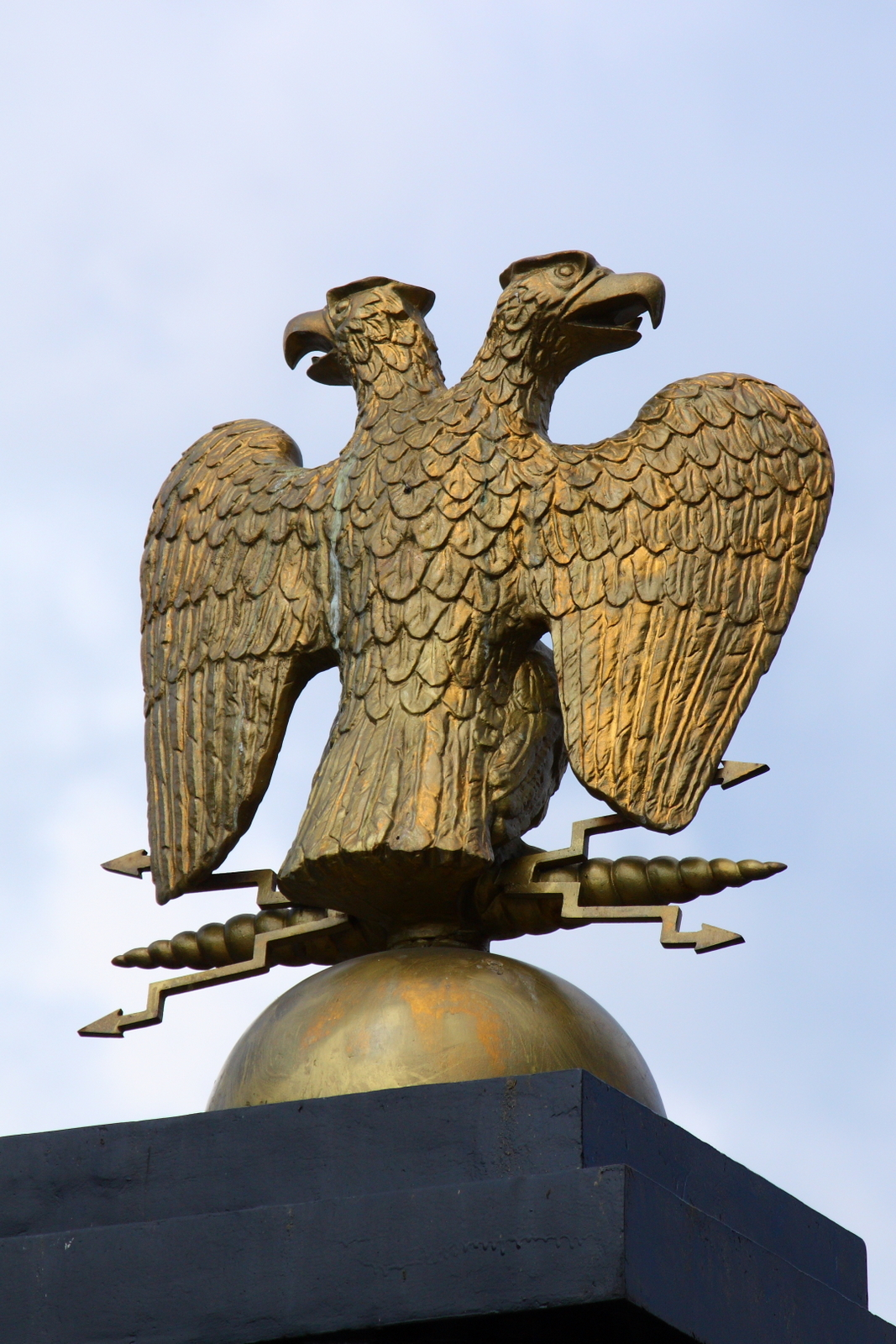
Sculpture of double-headed eagle on the gate of Alexander Garden in Moscow

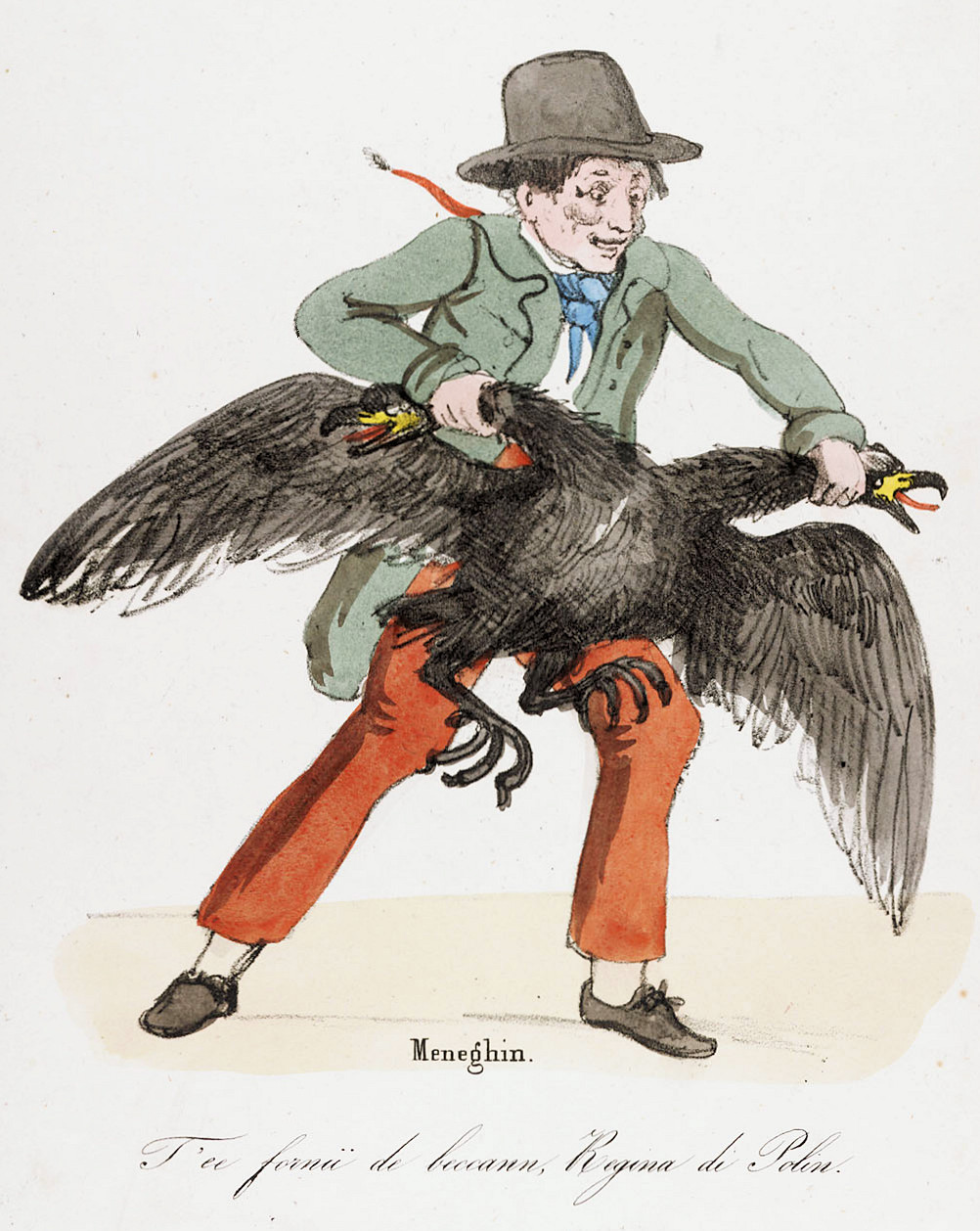
An anti-Austrian cartoon for the Five Days of Milan

In the painting The Attack by Edvard Isto, the double-headed eagle, symbolizing Russia, is tearing away the book of laws from the Finnish Maiden.

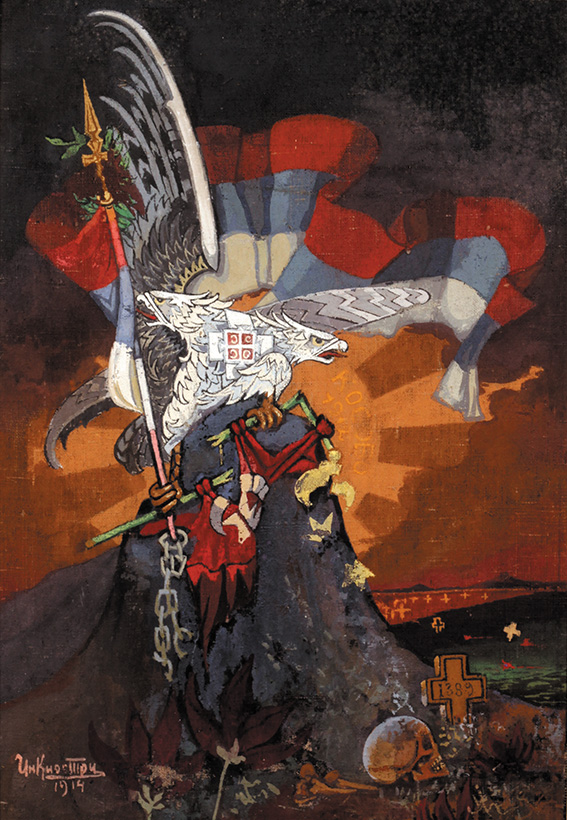
In the painting Sanctified Kosovo by Dragutin Inkiostri Medenjak, the double-headed eagle is holding the Serbian flag in one claw and ripping the flag of the Ottoman Empire in the other.

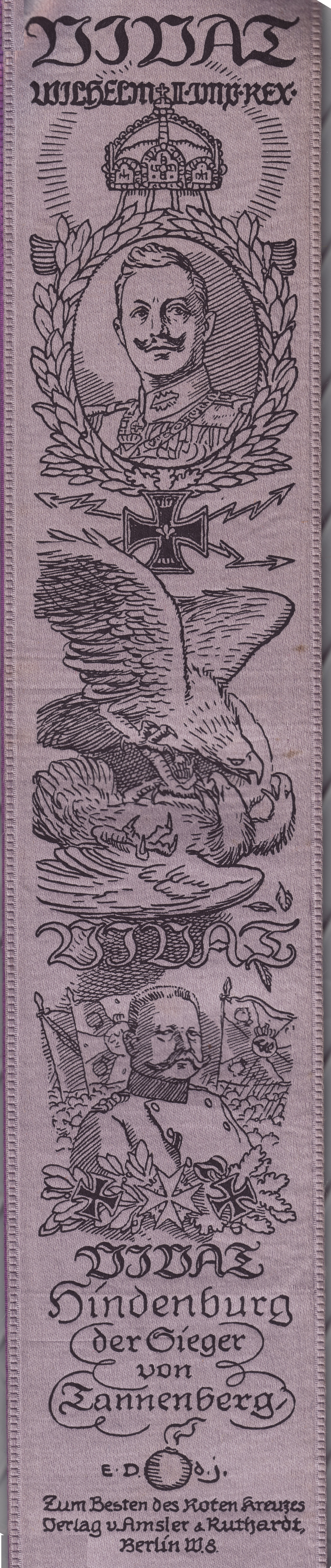
A vivat ribbon commemorating the Battle of Tannenberg with a single-headed eagle fight against a double-headed eagle.

A chandelier with double-headed eagle in the Ambassadors' Room of the Belém Palace in Lisbon, Portugal.

== See also ==
- Triple-headed eagle
- Coat of arms of Albania
- Coat of arms of Austria-Hungary
- Coat of arms of Russia
- Coat of arms of Serbia and Montenegro
- Crossed hands
- Hawk of Quraish
- Three-legged crow
