= Flag of the Greek Orthodox Church =

The Greek Orthodox churches in the diaspora under the Ecumenical Patriarchate use a black double-headed eagle in a yellow field as their flag or emblem.

== History ==
The symbology of using the double-headed eagle, used by Eastern Orthodox communities, originates from the persecution under the Ottoman Empire during the 15th century, which was adopted by the patriarch. It represents the symbol of authority.

== Description ==
The eagle is depicted as clutching a sword in one claw and a globus cruciger in the other, with a crown above and between its two heads.

== Use ==
The flag is most widely used in Greek Orthodox Churches, monasteries, parishes, and ecclesiastical bodies. It has also been displayed in the monasteries on Mount Athos. It is also flown outside of these communities during ceremonial celebrations. However, this is mostly a traditional custom rather than a written rule by the Eastern Orthodox Church.
