= Ogmios =

Celtic god of eloquence

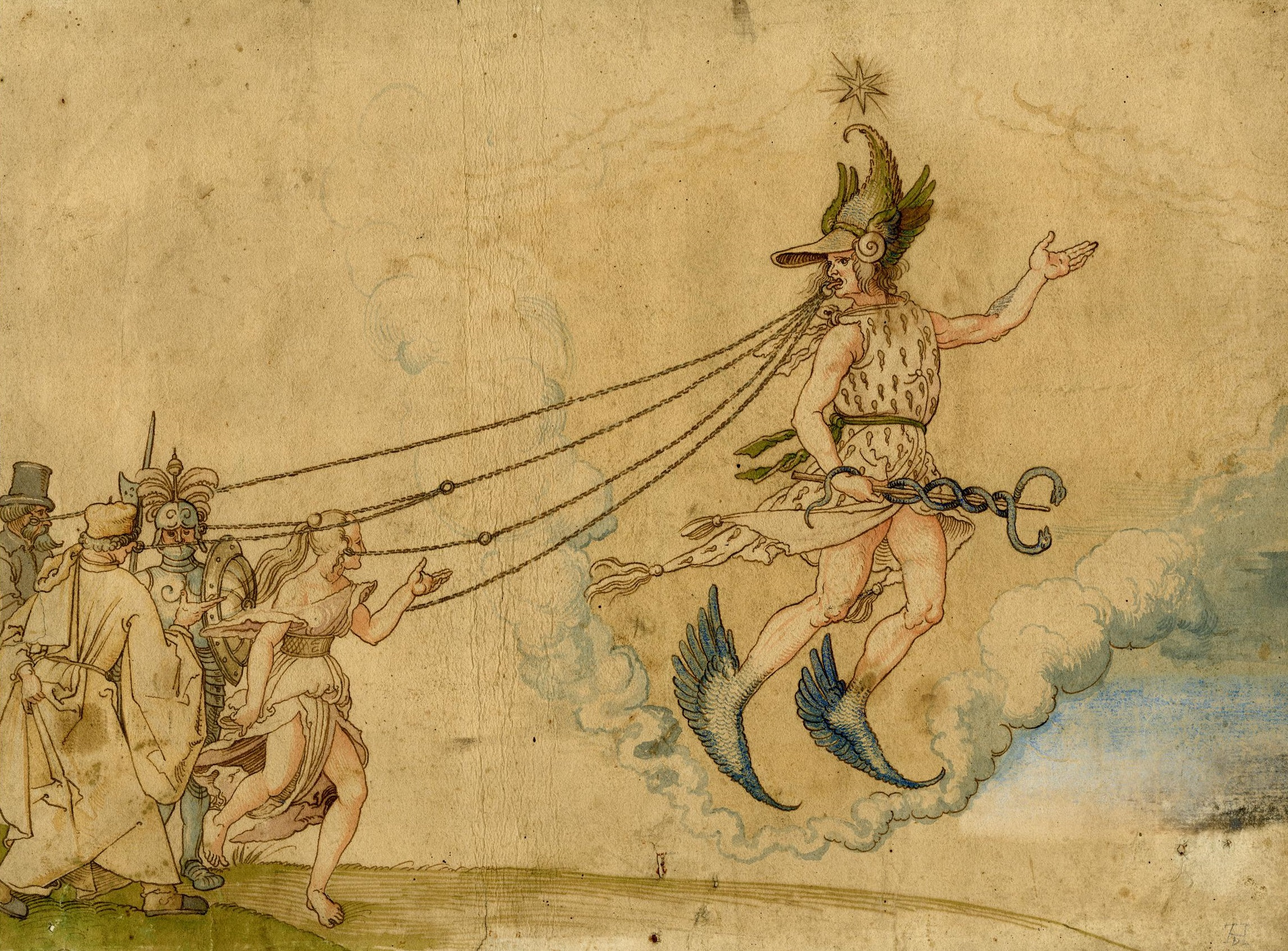
Albrecht Dürer's rendition of the image of Ogmios which Lucian describes

Ogmios (sometimes Ogmius; Ancient Greek: Ὄγμιος) is the name given to a Celtic god of eloquence described in Heracles, a c. 175 CE work of the Syrian satirist Lucian.

Lucian's Heracles is a prolalia, that is, a short text which was read aloud before a longer public performance. It describes Lucian's viewing of a strange image of Ogmios in Gaul, wherein the god is depicted as a dark-skinned, aged version of the Greek hero Heracles, with a group of happy devotees tied by bejewelled chains to this god's tongue. Lucian describes a Celt who approaches him and explains these features, informing him that they reflect a native association of Ogmios with eloquence, which, the Celt explains, reaches its highest level in old age. Lucian uses this anecdote to prove to his audience that, in old age, he is still competent to deliver public performances.

The evidence outside of Lucian's text for the god Ogmios is quite limited. No image has been uncovered which comes close to that which Lucian describes. The only further evidence for the god which has been largely accepted are on two curse tablets from Brigantium (in Austria), which invoke Ogmios's name. Most scholars accept the existence of the god Ogmios, but a minority have expressed scepticism.

In medieval Irish mythology, the god Ogma was fabled as the inventor of the early Irish alphabet Ogham. Ogmios has frequently been connected with Ogma, but the nature of this connection has proven difficult to define. An etymology linking Ogmios, Ogma, and Ogham poses unresolved chronological and phonological problems.

Lucian's text was much read in the Renaissance, and "Gallic Hercules" (as Ogmios was known) inspired a number of artistic works, including drawings by Albrecht Dürer and Hans Holbein the Younger.

== Etymology ==
Georges Dottin, Christian-Joseph Guyonvarc'h and Françoise Le Roux have proposed to derive the god's name derives from Greek ὄγμος (ógmos, "furrow, path"). Though Lucian tell us that Ogmios is the name of the god "in their [sc., the Celts'] native tongue", Guyonvarc'h and Le Roux believe it is possible the name may have been borrowed by Gaulish speakers from Greek in the parts of Gaul where Greek was widely spoken (such as Massalia). Jan de Vries is sceptical of this possibility. The Greek word ὄγμος seems to have had a connotation of leadership, which agrees with the iconography Lucian describes. The Nomina im Indogermanischen Lexikon notes the similarity with ἐπόγμιος (epógmios, "ruling over the furrows"), an epithet of the Greek god Demeter.

Celtic etymologies of the theonym have also been given. The potential existence of a reflex of the god's name in Irish mythology (Ogma, discussed below) has been taken to count in favour of such an etymology. Xavier Delamarre suggests that Ogmios is a reflex (through proto-Celtic) of proto-Indo-European *h₂óǵmos ("way"), derived from the PIE verbal root *h₂eǵ- ("to drive"). He associates with theonym with the meaning of "a leader along a path". Pierre-Yves Lambert suggested that Ogmios was a reflex of the proto-Celtic *oug- ("to sew").

== Lucian's Heracles ==
Lucian (125 CE – after 180 CE) was a Syrian satirist and rhetorician who wrote in Ancient Greek. His short work Heracles or Hercules (Ancient Greek: Ἡρακλέα, romanized: Irakléa) is a prolaliai, that is, a short introduction intended to arouse audience interest prior to a longer lecture. It reflects on its author's old age, and his ability to deliver public oratory, concluding with an emphatic affirmation of this ability. On this basis, the text is dated late in Lucian's life, after his return from Egypt in 175 CE. The passage relevant to Ogmios comes at the beginning, where Lucian delivers an ekphrasis (literary description of a work of art) of an image of Heracles:

The Celts call Heracles Ogmios in their native tongue, and they portray the god in a very peculiar way. To their notion, he is extremely old, (Note: Françoise Bader points out that Greek mythography presents Heracles as master of time and of death; never as an aged figure.) bald-headed, except for a few lingering hairs which are quite gray, his skin is wrinkled, and he is burned as black as can be, like an old sea-dog. You would think him a Charon or a sub-Tartarean Iapetus—anything but Heracles! Yet, in spite of his looks, he has the equipment of Heracles: he is dressed in the lion’s skin, has the club in his right hand, carries the quiver at his side, displays the bent bow in his left, and is Heracles from head to heel as far as that goes. I thought, therefore, that the Celts had committed this offence against the good-looks of Heracles to spite the Greek gods, and that they were punishing him by means of the picture for having once visited their country on a cattle-lifting foray, at the time when he raided most of the western nations in his quest of the herds of Geryon. (Note: In the course of his Tenth Labour, Heracles marched back through Western Europe with the cattle he had stolen from Geryon. Greco-Roman myth records his deeds in the various nations he passed through. Diodorus Siculus, for example, reports that in Gaul he imposed order and ended the custom of murdering foreigners. Diodorus thus presents Hercules' activities in Gaul in parallel to Caesar's conquests, as essentially civilising expeditions. Rather than a bringer as civilisation, Lucian's Heracles is a raider, despised in Gaul.) But I have not yet mentioned the most surprising thing in the picture. That old Heracles of theirs drags after him a great crowd of men who are all tethered by the ears! His leashes are delicate chains fashioned of gold and amber, resembling the prettiest of necklaces. Yet, though led by bonds so weak, the men do not think of escaping, as they easily could, and they do not pull back at all or brace their feet and lean in the opposite direction to that in which he is leading them. In fact, they follow cheerfully and joyously, applauding their leader and all pressing him close and keeping the leashes slack in their desire to overtake him; apparently they would be offended if they were let loose! But let me tell you without delay what seemed to me the strangest tiling of all. Since the artist had no place to which he could attach the ends of the chains, as the god’s right hand already held the club and his left the bow, he pierced the tip of his tongue and represented him drawing the men by that means! Moreover, he has his face turned toward his captives, and is smiling.

Puzzling at this picture, a Celt fluent in Greek, whom Lucian describes as versed in Greek and Celtic lore, interjects with an explanation. The copious quotations from Greek that the Celt adduces have been omitted from the following.

I will read you the riddle of the picture, stranger, as you seem to be very much disturbed about it. We Celts do not agree with you Greeks in thinking that Hermes is Eloquence: we identify Heracles with it, because he is far more powerful than Hermes. And don’t be surprised that he is represented as an old man, for eloquence and eloquence alone is wont to show its full vigour in old age [...] This being so, if old Heracles here drags men after him who are tethered by the ears to his tongue, don’t be surprised at that, either: you know the kinship between ears and tongue. Nor is it a slight upon him that his tongue is pierced. [...] In general, we consider that the real Heracles was a wise man who achieved everything by eloquence and applied persuasion as his principal force. His arrows represent words, I suppose, keen, sure and swift, which make their wounds in souls. In fact, you yourselves admit that words are winged.

Lucian often chose exotic subject matter to arouse his audience's interest. His choice of subject matter in Heracles was no doubt tailored towards this end; his listeners, likely in the Greek East, would have hardly been familiar with Celtic society. The rhetorician's intentions were, in turn, hardly ethnographic. Andreas Hofeneder points out that Lucian neglects to tell us where in Gaul his story takes place; what sort of building the picture was located in; and even the nature of the picture (whether a relief, a mosaic, or a painting). Lucian's other writings tell us that he worked as rhetorician in Gaul, but they do not tell us where or when. (Note: Lucian's life is largely known from autobiographical remarks in his writings. In Apologia 15, Lucian tells us that "on that Atlantic tour of yours which included Gaul, you found me numbered among those teachers who could command high fees". In Bis Accusatus sive Tribunalia 27, Rhetoric personified tells us "I sailed the Ionian Sea with him [sc., Lucian] and attended him even as far as Gaul".) It has been suggested that Lucian's narrative may have taken place in the semi-Hellenized south of Gaul, perhaps Massalia, but this is far from certain.

The speaker who interjects to explain the image (in this narrative, a learned Celt) is something of a stock figure in ekphrases. Paul Friedländer pointed out that Lucian's introduction of the Celt borrows material from the Tabula Cebetis, a popular philosophical ekphrasis. Lucian describes the Celt as a "philosopher in local matters". (Note: Ancient Greek: φιλόσοφος τὰ ἐπιχώρια, romanized: filósofos tá epichória.) It was common in Greek accounts of the Celts to refer to the druids as philosophers, and on this basis it has been suggested that the Celt who addressed Lucian was a druid, however by the time Lucian wrote the druids had been suppressed by Roman decree for over a century. Eugenio Amato suggests that if Lucian had encountered a druid, he would have been unlikely to credit a member of the maligned religious order so highly. Amato has suggested that the Celtic speaker is Lucian's imitation of his contemporary Favorinus, a Roman sophist of Gaulish extraction who had great command of Greek poetry and wrote a discourse on old age, and whom Lucian elsewhere refers to. The abundant quotations from Greek literature may reflect Favorinus's preoccupations, though little of the sophist's work has survived.

The reality of the image Lucian describes has been repeatedly doubted. Lucian's characteristic mixture of satire and journalism, and especially the mockery he directs towards religious feeling, make him a problematic source for the history of religion. The view of scholars in the 19th and early 20th centuries of Lucian as a straightforward purveyor of falsehoods has largely subsided, and scholars now tend to take a more nuanced view. In the 19th and early 20th centuries researchers were unanimous in seeing Lucian's image as an invention. More recent scholarship has been balanced between the two views.

In favour of the existence of this image, it has been pointed out that nothing about Lucian's story is impossible. The satirist certainly visited Gaul, where wall paintings of mythological scenes are known to have existed. Amato suggests he could have learned of this picture from Favorinus. Marion Euskirchen took the "detailed iconographic elements of the image described by Lucian, as well as their unusual combination" to speak to its veracity. Friedrich Koepp and German Hafner accept it as authentic, but are sceptical of Lucian's explanation. Hafner, for example, argued the image was identifiable as a classical depiction of Heracles' enemy Geras, though Euskirchen is unconvinced the ekphrasis can be read this way.

Against its existence, sceptics have adduced "the absurdity of this explanation, and its all-too-visible link with the necessities of a prolalia". Jaś Elsner, for example, calls the image "effectively a self-portrait of the orator as an old man". No wall paintings with scenes of a non-classical type have survived in Gaul. Wolfgang Spickermann suggests that Lucian composed plausible elements (allegorical painting, the god Ogmios, his stay in Gaul) fictitiously for literary ends. More recently, scholars such as Gerhard Bauchhenß and Hofeneder have counted the paucity of archaeological evidence for Ogmios (discussed below) against the reality of this image.

== Ogmios outside of Lucian ==
Lucian's text is a valuable, but problematic and isolated source. Ogmios is mentioned nowhere else in classical literature, with the exception of two Byzantine lexicons which clearly depend on Lucian. The archaeological evidence for Ogmios is very limited. The only mostly-accepted attestations of the god, outside of Lucian, are two curse tablets from Brigantium. The existence of Ogmios is accepted by a majority of scholars, even by some (such as Spickermann) who doubt the authenticity of Lucian's narrative. A minority—Bauchhenß and Hofeneder—have expressed scepticism about Ogmios's existence.

=== Hercules in Gaul ===
By way of his adventures through Western Europe, ancient literature often associated Hercules and the Celts. Parthenius of Nicaea, for example, claimed that Heracles was, through his son Keltos, progenitor of all the Celts. In the Roman era, Hercules was worshipped in Gaul, especially in his role as patron of sacred springs. However, Ogmios does not seem to have been important to this worship. The epigraphic evidence reveals very little linking Hercules to native deities; and nothing at all linking Hercules to Ogmios.

The iconographic evidence for Hercules Ogmios is little more impressive. No images of Hercules found in Gaul come near the arrangement described by Lucian. Salomon Reinach linked Ogmios to two representations of a seemingly aged Heracles, both from Gaul and quite late: a bronze statuette of Hercules, bent with age; and a terra sigillata with a relief of an apparently bald Hercules. However, Stephanie Boucher argued the hunch of the former was a product of low quality bronze-work; and Euskirchen has argued that the latter's baldness could have been caused by wear to the pottery.

=== Curse tablets ===
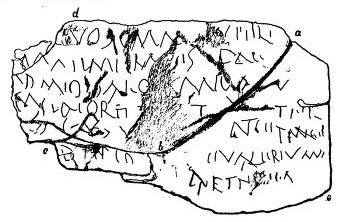
1st-century CE curse tablet, now lost, perhaps invoking Ogmios to silence court witnesses.

Two curse tablets, both found in Brigantium (in Austria), have been linked to Ogmios. The first, discovered in 1865 and now lost, dates to the 1st century CE; (Note: CIL III, 11882 = Sánchez Natalías, Sylloge of Defixiones from the Roman West, no. 520.) the second, discovered in 1930, dates to the 1st/2nd century CE. (Note: Sánchez Natalías, Sylloge of Defixiones from the Roman West, no. 521.) The former curse invokes a god to silence any witnesses who would speak against the (female) curse-writer's interest in court. The latter curse invokes Dis Pater and another god to damage a young woman's body in order that she may be made unmarriageable. In 1943, Robert Egger proposed to read both these tablets as invoking the god Ogmios. Egger's readings have largely met with agreement in the scholarly literature, though Hofeneder and Euskirchen have expressed scepticism.

Egger argued that only gods of the underworld were invoked on curse tablets, and that therefore Ogmios should be interpreted as a chthonic deity. Further to this point, Egger pointed out that Lucian compares Ogmios to Iapetus and Charon, both figures of the Greek underworld. Egger's association of Ogmios with the underworld has met with some agreement in the literature, but more often with scepticism. De Vries points out that a god only had to be considered powerful to be invoked in a curse. For example (as Euskirchen points out) a curse tablet invoking Nodens (a Celtic god of healing) is known from Gloucestershire. (Note: CIL VII, 140 = Sánchez Natalías, Sylloge of Defixiones from the Roman West, no. 205) Euskirchen will also not allow that Lucian's comparison of Ogmios to Iapetus and Charon goes further than their skin colour.

=== Other possible attestations ===
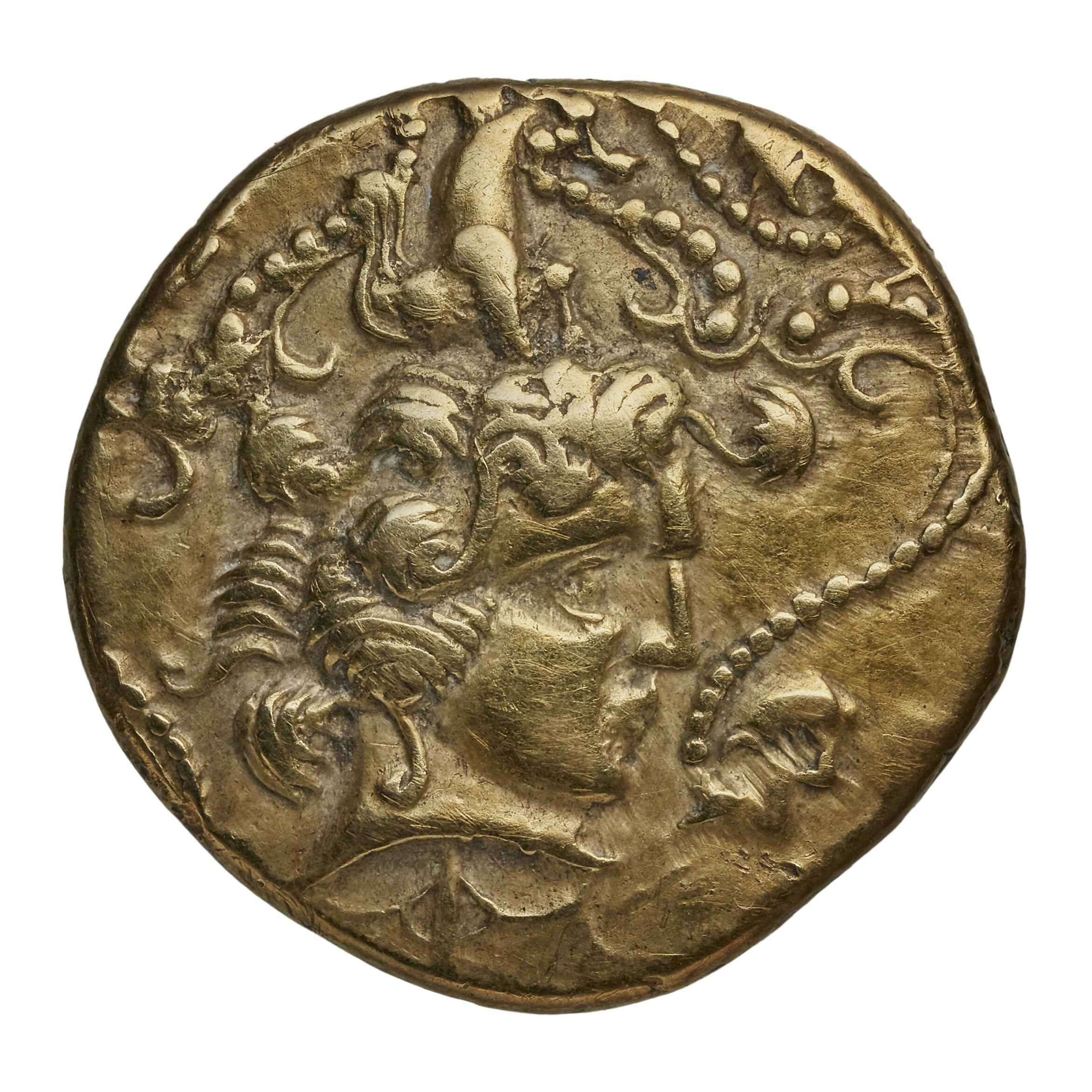
Gold stater of the Armorican Veneti, with a head on which a hippocamp perches amid beaded strands

Eugène Hucher connected Lucian's image of Ogmios with coin-type from Armorica, on one side of which is depicted a beardless male bust with a number of pearl-like chains extending from his head. Any relationship of this coin-type with Ogmios is largely rejected now, following arguments by Charles Robert, who pointed out that the coins appear to be copies of Greek staters of Philip II, and in any case diverge from Lucian's Ogmios insofar as the coins depict a young man, with chains emerging from his head rather than his mouth, and no faces on the end of these chains. De Vries accepts the possibility that these coins represent a different iconographic variety of Ogmios, known in the north of Gaul.

Outside than the curse tablets, a few inscriptions are insecurely connected with Ogmios. Fritz Heichelheim tentatively identified an inscription on a bronze statue base (Note: CIL XIII, 11295: Ogl. Aug. sac./ Ateuritus/ seplas(iarius) v(otum) s(olvit) l(ibens) m(erito). The initial portion was reconstructed by Heichelheim as Og(mio) L(aribus) Aug(ustis), hence a dedication to Ogmios.) as a votive dedication to Ogmios. Heichelheim's reconstruction has been generally rejected, going back as far as Egger. A lost inscription from Salins-les-Thermes (Note: CIL XII, 5710) was originally read as a votive inscription to Herculei Ograio. Théodore Reinach wanted to emend this to Herculei Ogmio, but it is more likely that this the inscription originally reproduced the known name-pairing Hercueli Graio. Two inscriptions from Iberia, (Note: Hispania Epigraphica 2006, 368 and Hispania Epigraphica 1993, 494) which Francisco Marco Simón connected with Ogmios, have been given recent readings which preclude his interpretations. A votive altar to Hercules Gallicus in Piedimonte Matese (in Italy), (Note: CIL IX, 2322) a name-pairing not otherwise attested, could be connected to Ogmios, but is more likely to be related to a local toponym.

Evidence for Ogmios from proper names has been proposed, but this evidence is quite limited and late. A 4th-century CE inscription on a vase found in Kent gives the female personal name Ocmia, which was interpreted by Anne Ross as a female form of Ogmios. The Frankish personal name Ogmireectherius, recorded in the 7th century CE, was given a Celtic etymology by Alfred Holder, who thought the first half of the name incorporated the theonym Ogmios, though Christian-Joseph Guyonvarc'h has given a Germanic etymology without reference to the theonym.

== In later mythology ==
=== Ogma and Ogham ===
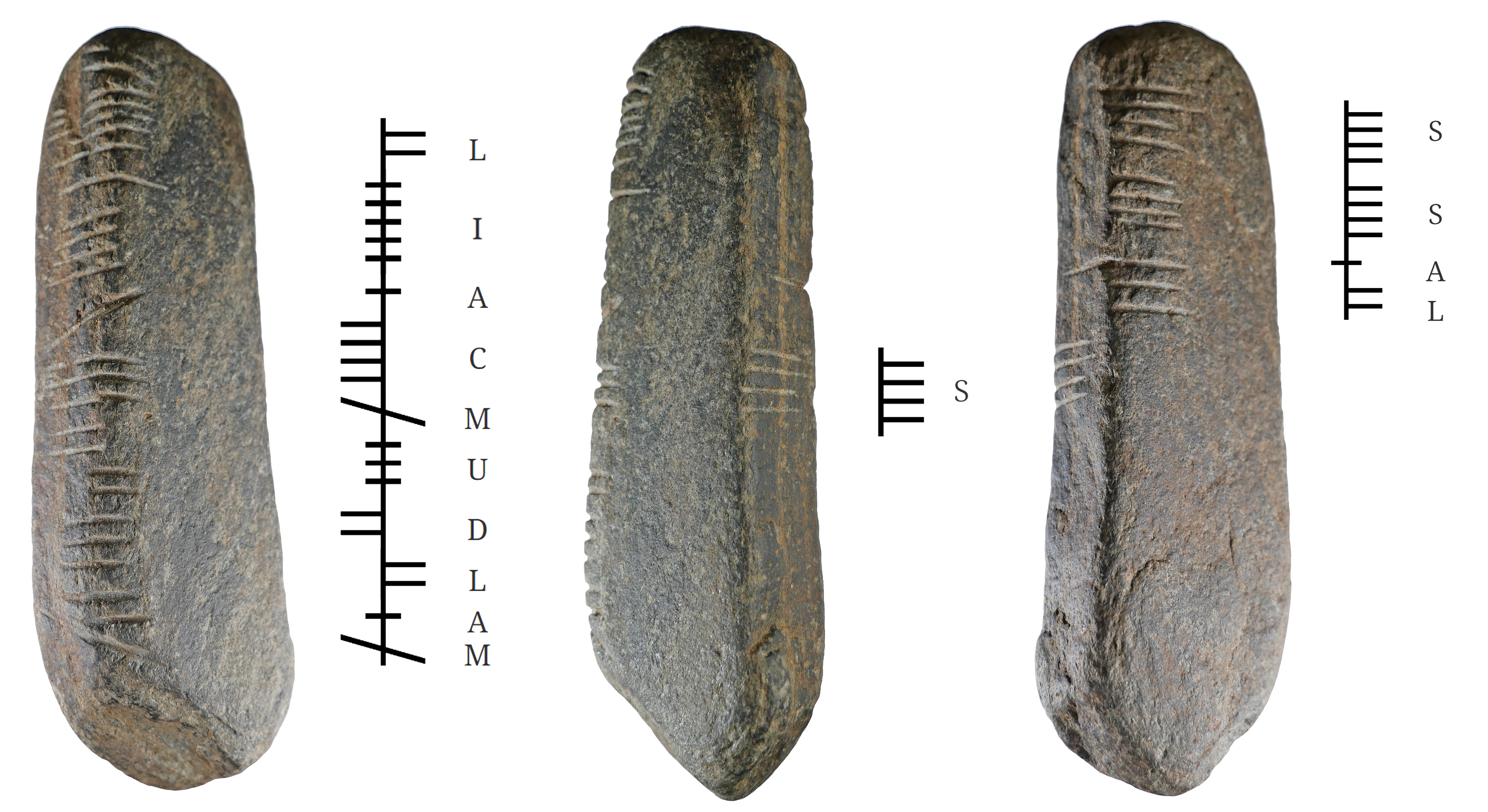
Ogham text on a sandstone rock

Ogma is a figure of Irish mythology, an orator and warrior of the Tuatha Dé Danann (a supernatural race in medieval Irish literature often thought to represent euhemerized pre-Christian deities). Ogma is described as the inventor of Ogham, an alphabet used to write the early Irish language. A relationship between Ogma and Ogmios has been supposed, but scholars have been "hard-pressed to delineate" the relationship between these figures, as James MacKillop has put it.

The etymologies of Ogma and Ogham are uncertain. It is not even certain that their etymologies must be connected. As Bernhard Maier has pointed out, the tradition which connects Ogma to Ogham is late, and may only reflect the superficial similarity of the two words. The proposal to explain Ogma as a reflex of Ogmios may pose phonological difficulties. The development of proto-Celtic "gm" in Irish is not clear. If it developed like "gn", the initial g would be dropped, in which case proto-Celtic *Ogmo- would have given rise to Middle Irish *Úam or *Óm rather than Ogma. If this is the case, a relationship between Ogma and Ogmios would have to be explained by a late borrowing from Gaulish, which creates chronological difficulties for an etymology connecting Ogma and Ogham. On the other hand, given the state of the evidence, Ranko Matasović entertains the possibility that "g" was preserved before "m" in the transition to Irish.

=== Other myths ===
John Arnott MacCulloch connected Ogmios with some episodes from the Irish tale Táin Bó Cúailnge: one, where a gloomy figure drags seven unwilling figures by a chain around his neck; another, where Cú Chulainn grows angry and his body distorts itself horribly, in such a way as MacCulloch compares with iconography of Ogmios. De Vries is sceptical of these parallels, and points out differences between the iconography in Lucian and these scenes.

John Rhŷs proposed that Eufydd fab Dôn, a minor figure of Welsh mythology, was cognate with Ogmios. This hypothesis has more recently received the favour of Claude Sterckx.

== In the Renaissance ==
The reception of Lucian's ekphrasis of Hercules Ogmios in the Renaissance has been described as "astonishingly rich". Such sources such as Andrea Alciato's much-read Emblemata and the mythographies of Annius of Viterbo and Natalis Comes popularised the myth of "Gallic Hercules" among humanists and artists. In France, Gallic Hercules was regarded as a founder of the nation, and associated with the French monarchy. A sculpture of Francis I as Ogmios, binding the Four Estates by his tongue, was unveiled in Paris upon the entry of Henry II in 1549. Albrecht Dürer's rendition of Ogmios as Hermes (pictured above) is well known, but there is also a drawing from the School of Raphael, a wall painting in the Escurialense, and a very large number of printed woodcuts.

=== Gallery ===
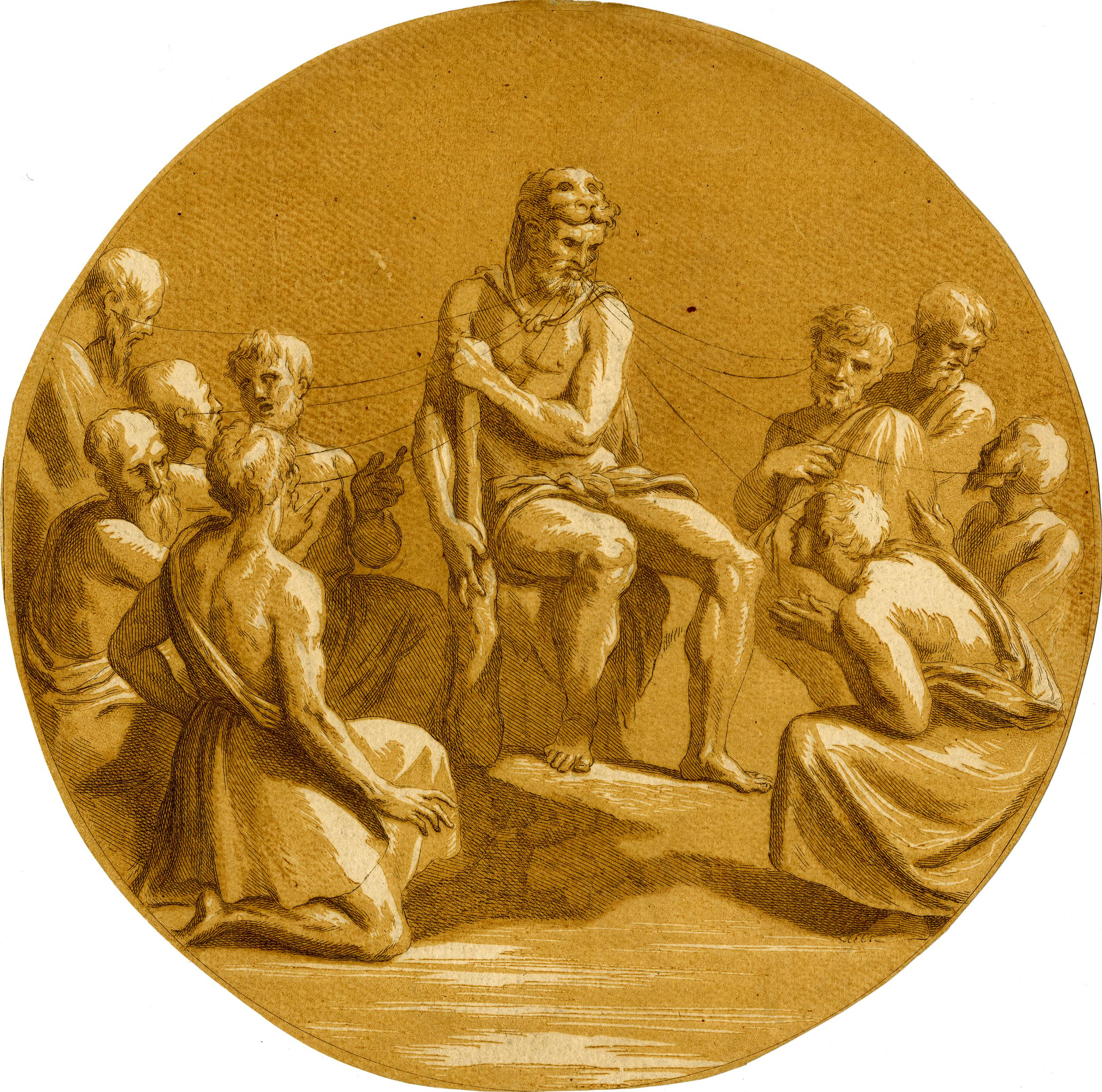
Drawing by School of Raphael

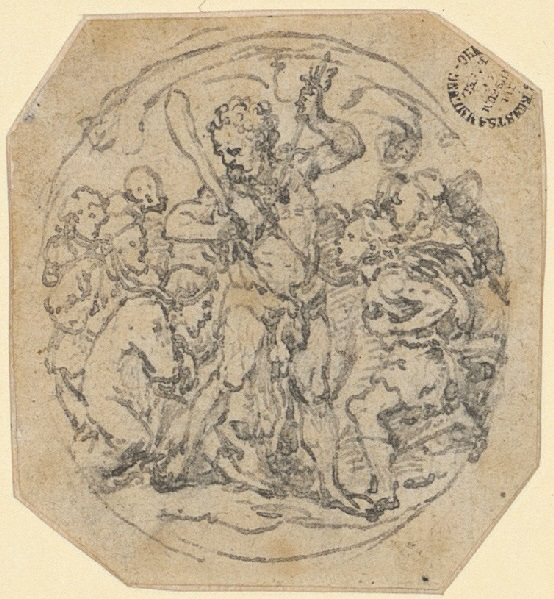
Sketch by Hans Holbein the Younger

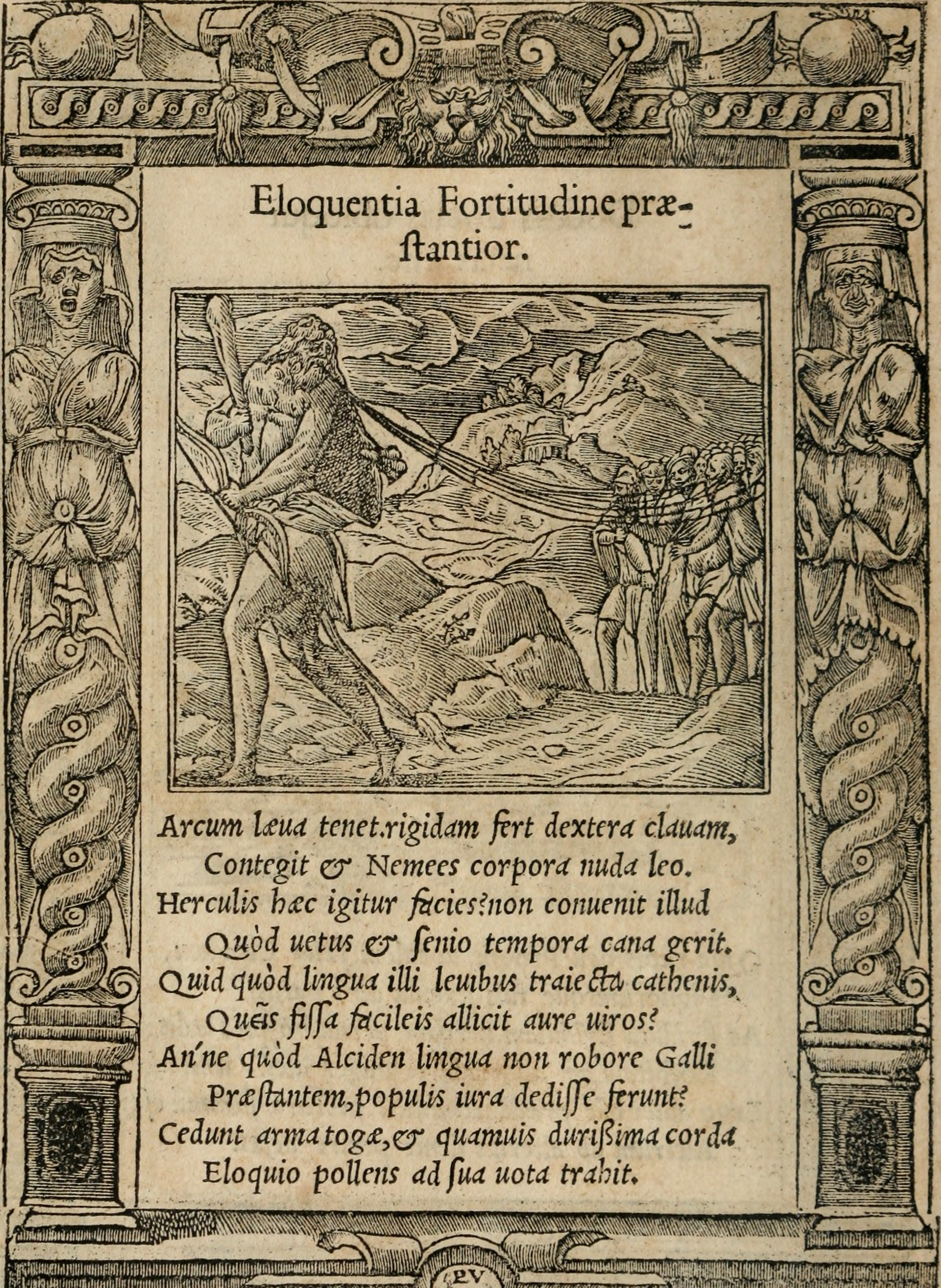
Woodcut from Alciato's Emblemata (1518)

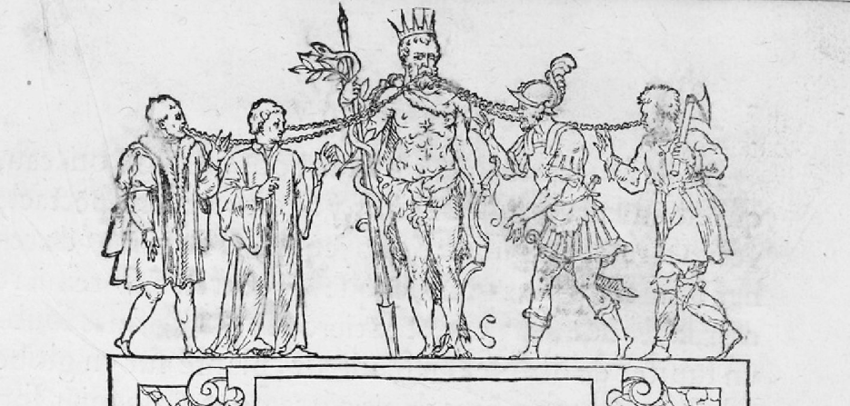
Sculpture of Francis I as Gallic Hercules

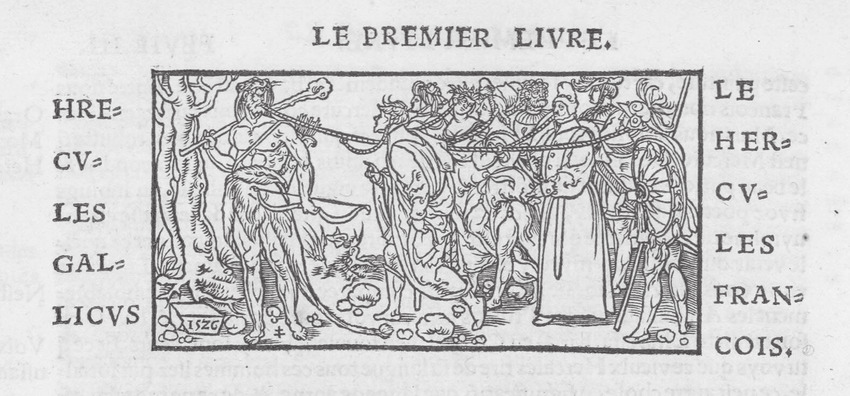
Woodcut of Francis I as Gallic Hercules

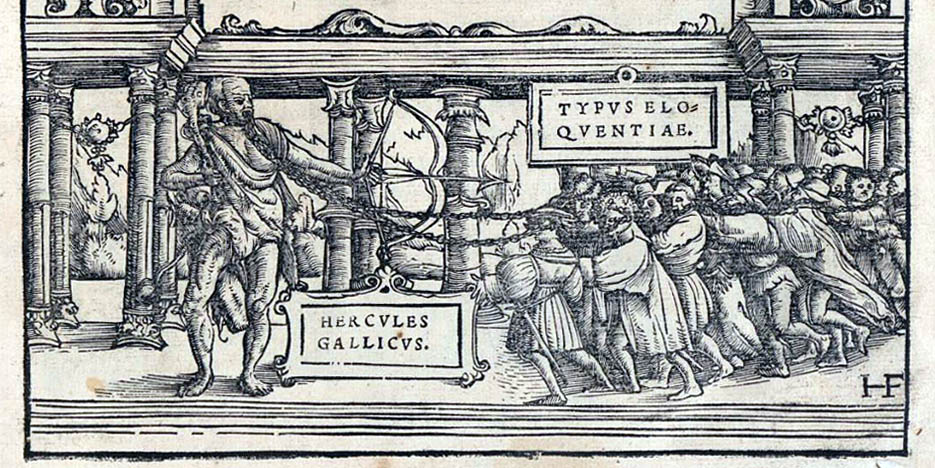
Woodcut by Hans Frank (for Andreas Cratander's Dictionarium graecum (1519).)

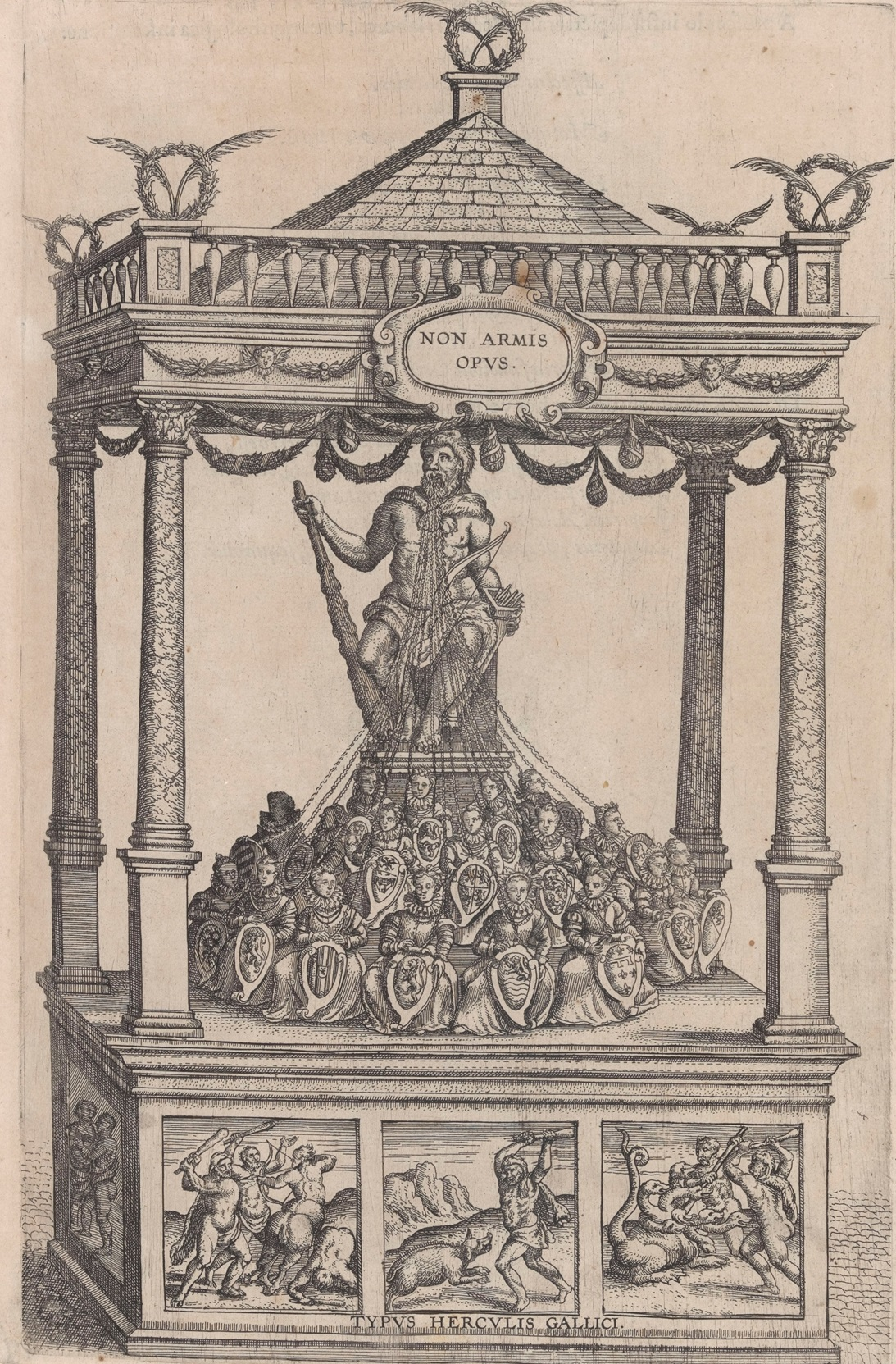
Gallic Hercules by Pieter van der Borcht

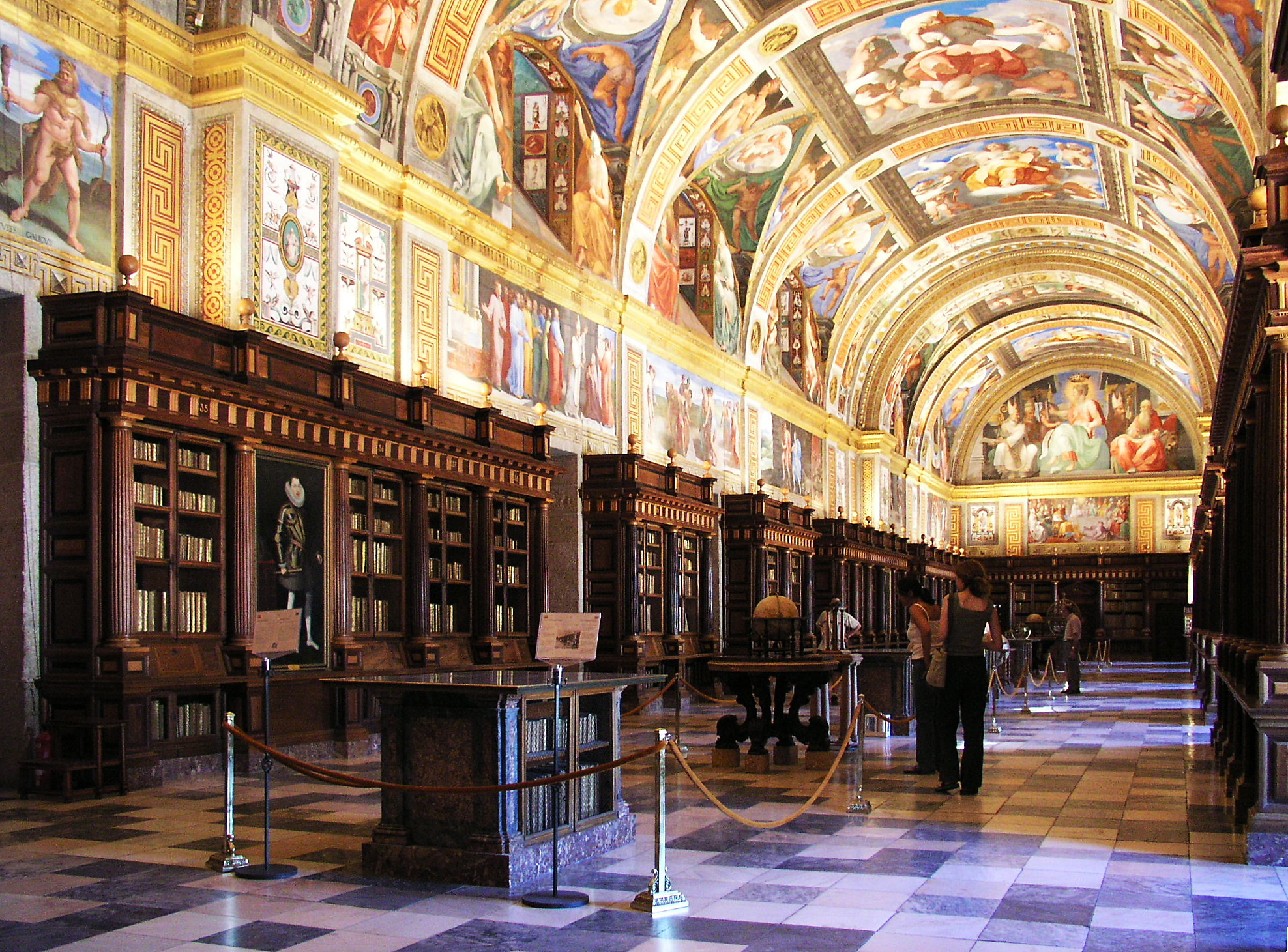
Painting of Gallic Hercules (top left) in the Escurialense,

== See also ==
- De Dea Syria
- Lugus
