= Andreas Cratander =

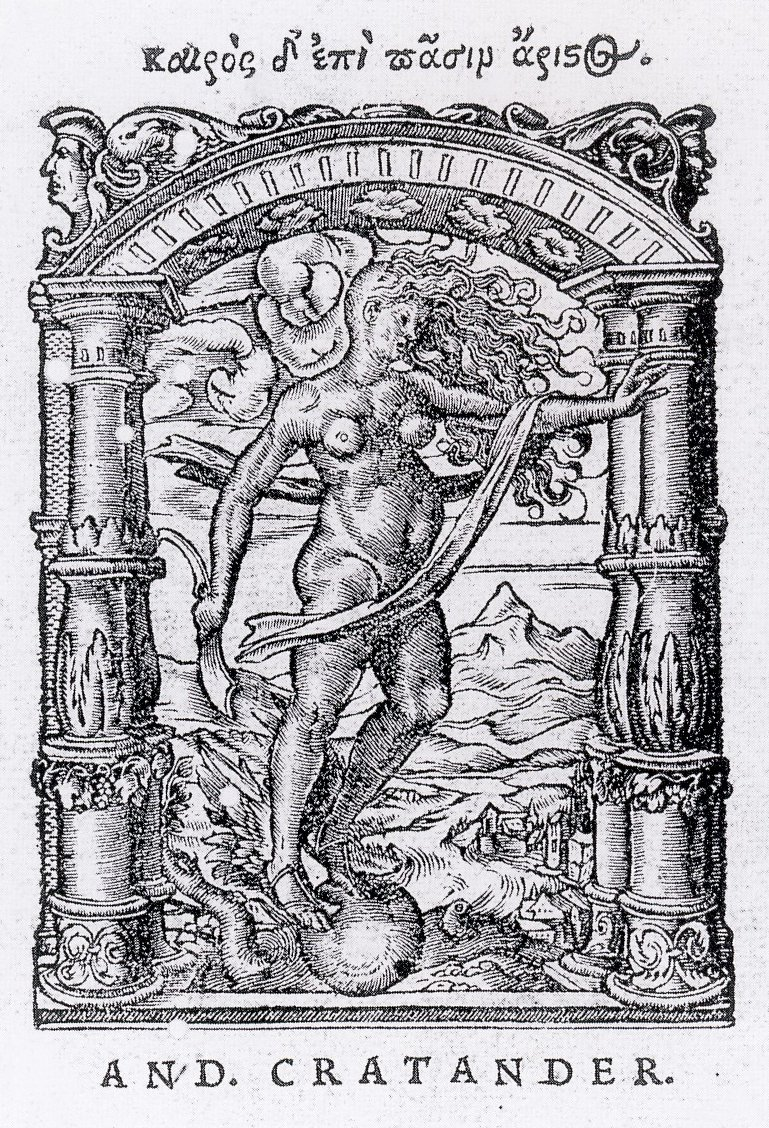
Printer's Device for Andreas Cratander, designed by Hans Holbein the Younger and metalcut by Jacob Faber, 1522. The Greek motto translates: "In all things it is best to take advantage of the right time."

Andreas Cratander (born Andreas Hartmann in Strasbourg, ca. 1490; died 1540) was a Swiss printer, publisher, and book seller. Based in Basel, his workshop is estimated to have published at least 150 individual works between 1518 and 1535, predominantly Latin and Greek classics in their original languages.

== Education and Work ==
He studied at the University of Heidelberg, where he graduated with a baccalaureate. After he learned the ropes in the workshop of the printer Matthias Schürcher in Strasbourg. From 1515 he worked for Adam Petri in Basel. In 1518, he opened his own print and from 1522 employed the later reformator of Basel Johannes Oecolampadius. Oecolampadius would also lodge in his house. He published a reprint of the commentaries to the Evangeliums of Jacques Lefèvre d'Étaples in 1523 whose cover was adorned with a metalcut of Hans Holbein the Younger, signed by Jacob Faber. Lefèvre was so impressed, he gave Cratander his commentaries to the letters of the New Testament to print.
