= Hans Lützelburger =

German artist (died 1526)

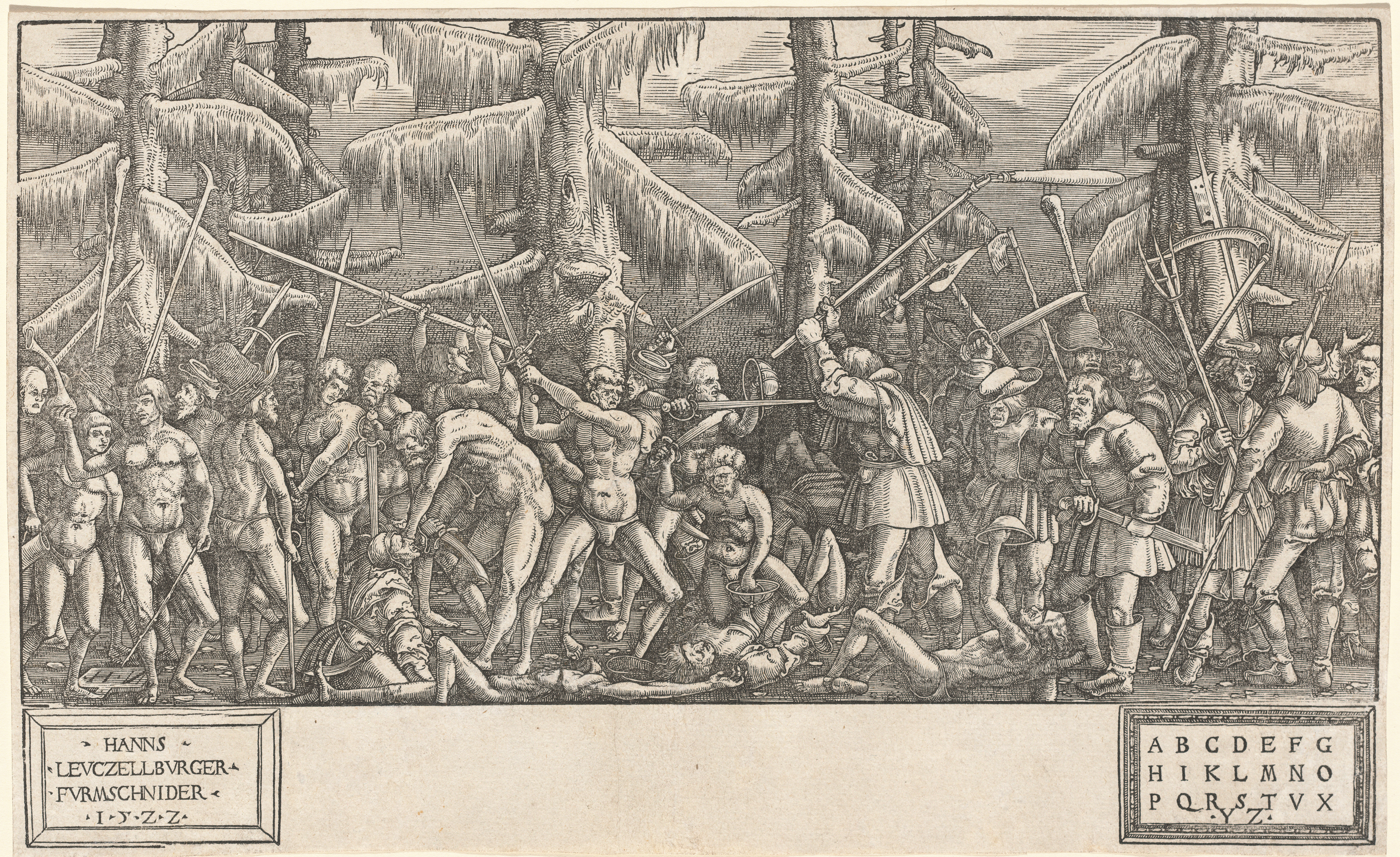
Battle of Naked Men and Peasants by Master NH (Nicolas Hogenberg)

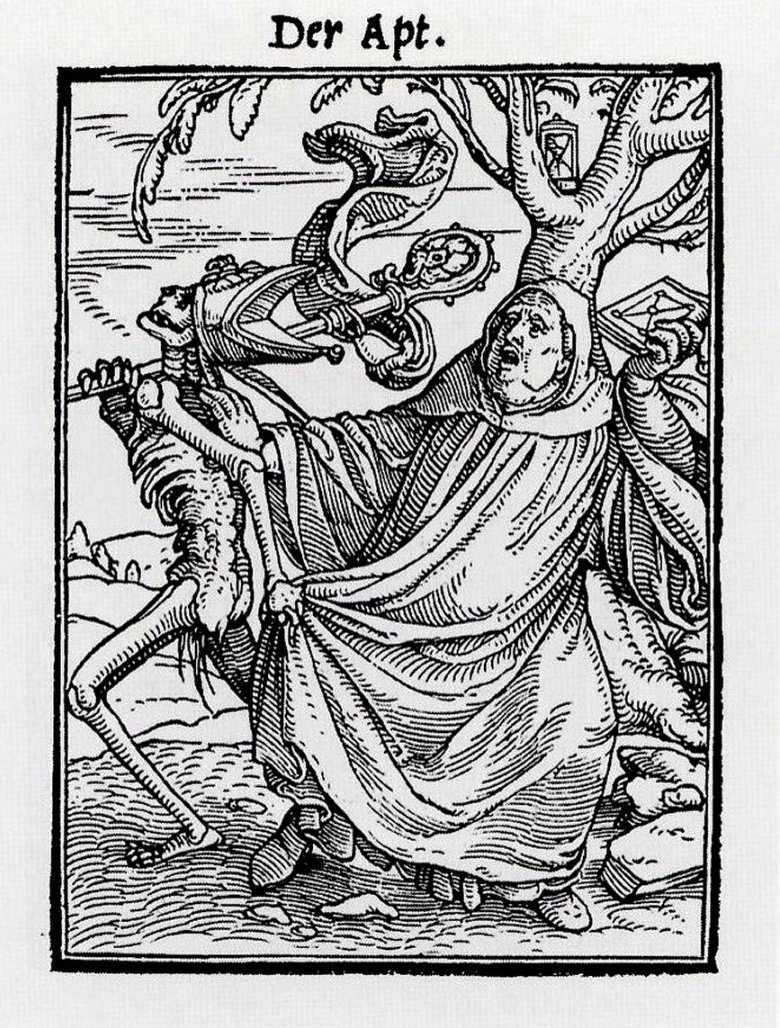
The Abbot from the Dance of Death by Holbein. 6.5 x 4.8 cm. A so-called "proof" impression, with a title rather than text.

Hans Lützelburger (died June 1526), also known as Hans Franck, was a German blockcutter ("formschneider") for woodcuts, regarded as one of the finest of his day. He cut the blocks but as far as is known was not an artist himself. He is best known for his virtuoso work on 41 of the "superbly cut" series of tiny woodcuts of the Dance of Death, designed by Hans Holbein the Younger, which Lützelburger left unfinished when he died.

He is known to have been active, and already well-established, in Augsburg from c. 1516, where he was working, and signing the reverse of blocks, under Jost de Negker, the other great blockcutter of the period, on the print projects for Maximilian I, Holy Roman Emperor involving Albrecht Dürer, Hans Burgkmair and other artists. In 1522 his "first undoubted masterpiece", the Battle of Naked Men and Peasants by Master NH (possibly Nicholaus Hogenberg), was published, which in at least one edition carried an extra block in the margin below with his name as "FURMSCHNIDER" and the date in a tablet - a very unusual feature. This also includes portraits of Lützelburger and the artist, naked except for cloths covering their genitals, pointing to the tablet.

He was active from about 1522 in Basel (after a period in Mainz), where he died in 1526. He and Holbein were contracted by the publisher Jakob Faber for more than one series of Bible illustrations (for editions of Martin Luther's translation), as well as the Dance of Death. He and Holbein also worked for the major publisher Johann Froben. He had only completed 41 of the scenes of the Dance of Death at his death. These were issued as prints in the early 1520s, sometimes wrongly called "proofs", and when they were published in book form in 1538, with added verses, they referred only to Lützelburger, it having apparently been forgotten that Holbein was involved. Later editions added other designs cut by others, probably not all by Holbein. The blocks formed part of his estate at his death.

He seems to have produced so much work in his last years at Basel that he may well have had assistants, although there is no documentation for this. He may also have been responsible for cutting the most impressive work of the Basel artist Urs Graf, his series of 16 white-line woodcuts of Standardbearers.
