= Lukas Furtenagel =

German painter

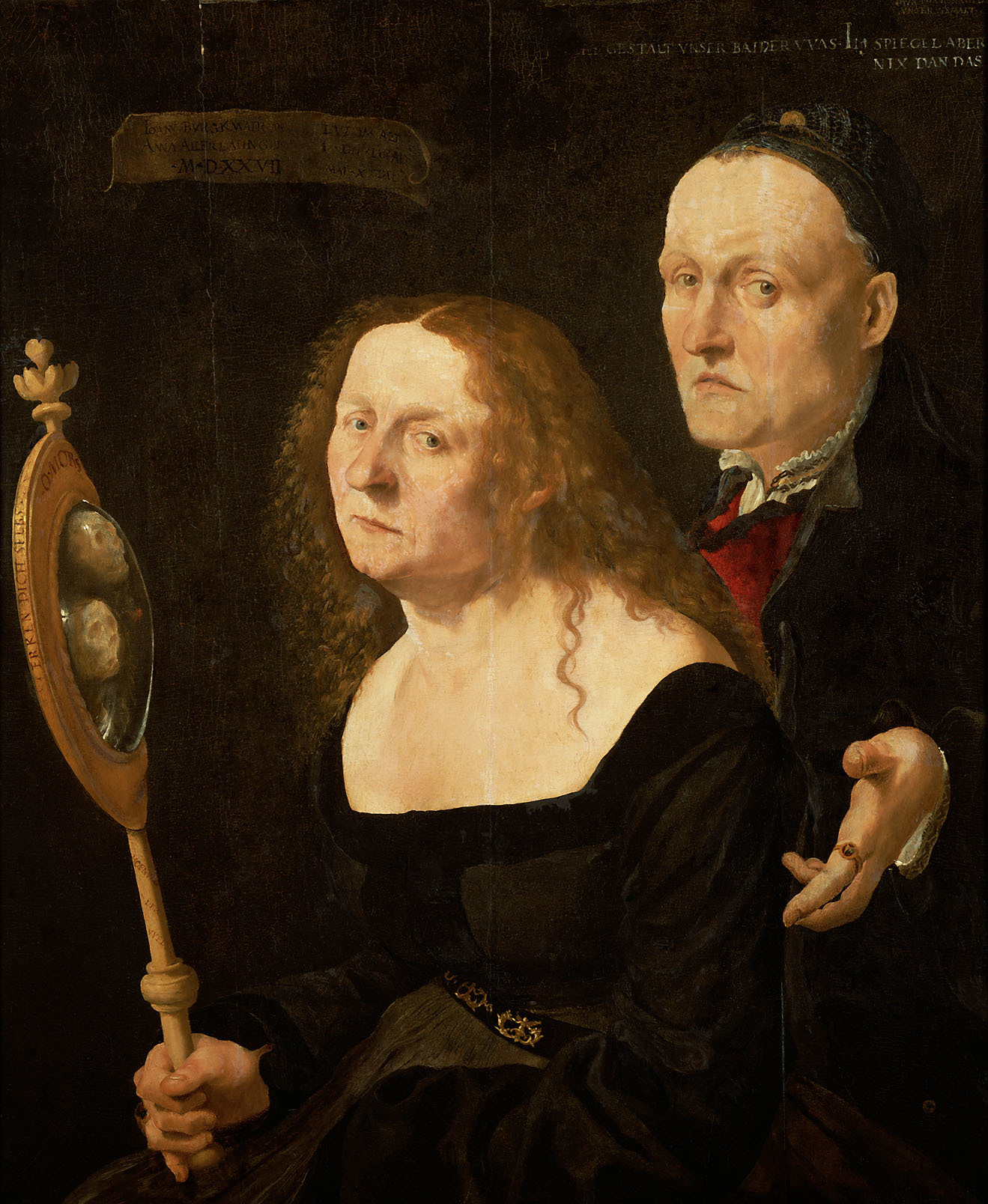
The painter Hans Burgkmair and his wife Anna by Lukas Furtenagel, Kunsthistorisches Museum, 1529

Lukas Furtenagel (1505–1546) was a painter from the Holy Roman Empire.

Lukas (Laux) Furtenagel was born in Augsburg in 1505 to a family of artists. He began studying art at a young age and was a protégé of painter Hans Burgkmair.

Furtenagel began his apprenticeship in 1515 at the age of 10. After leaving Augsburg, he briefly joined the workshop of Lucas Cranach the Elder in Wittenberg. Furtenagel was active in Halle from 1542 to 1546. In 1546, he was called to Eisleben to portray Martin Luther after the latter's death. In the fall of 1546, after returning to Augsburg, Furtenagel was awarded the title of master.

== Notable works ==
Few of Furtenagel's works survive. One of his most notable is a double portrait of Hans Burgkmair with his wife Anna, ages 56 and 52 respectively. The work, a vanitas, shows the artist and his wife reflected in a hand-mirror as death's heads. The inscription on the mirror reads "Recognize thyself/o death/hope of the world". Prior to the discovery of Furtenagel's signature, the portrait was believed to have been painted by Burgkmair himself. The work is currently held in the Kunsthistorisches Museum, Vienna.

One of Furtenagel's most enduring and popular work is his posthumous portrait of Martin Luther. Upon Luther's death on February 18, 1546, Furtenagel was summoned to Eisleben from Halle. Earlier in the day, an unknown artist from Eisleben depicted Luther on his deathbed. By the time Furtenagel arrived, Luther had already been placed in his coffin. Furtenagel's drawing served as the basis for several reproductions, including Lucas Cranach the Younger's Portrait of Martin Luther on his Death Bed (1546). Furtenagel depicted Luther's body twice, first on the 18th and then again the following day. The surviving drawing is currently held in the Staatliche Museen, Berlin.

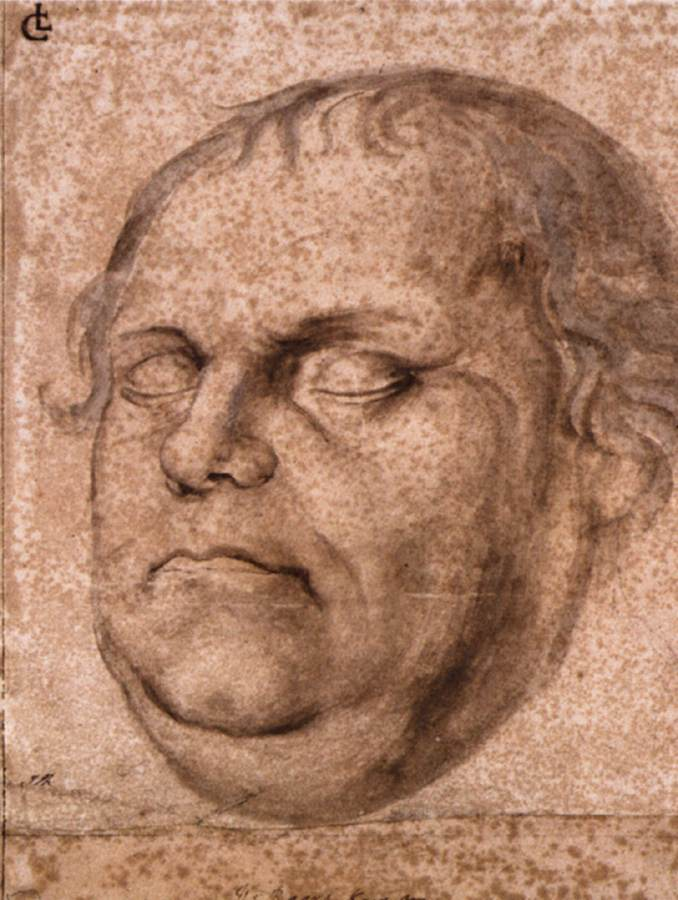
Drawing of Martin Luther by Furtenagel
