= Jost de Negker =

German artist (c. 1485–1544)

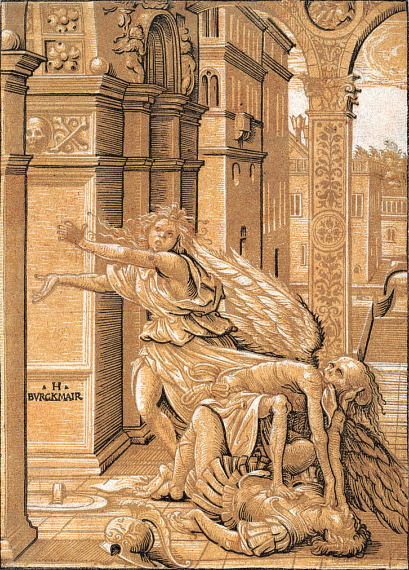
Lovers Surprised by Death, Chiaroscuro woodcut in three colours by Hans Burgkmair, cut by de Negker, 1510. In some states de Negker's name appears below the image.

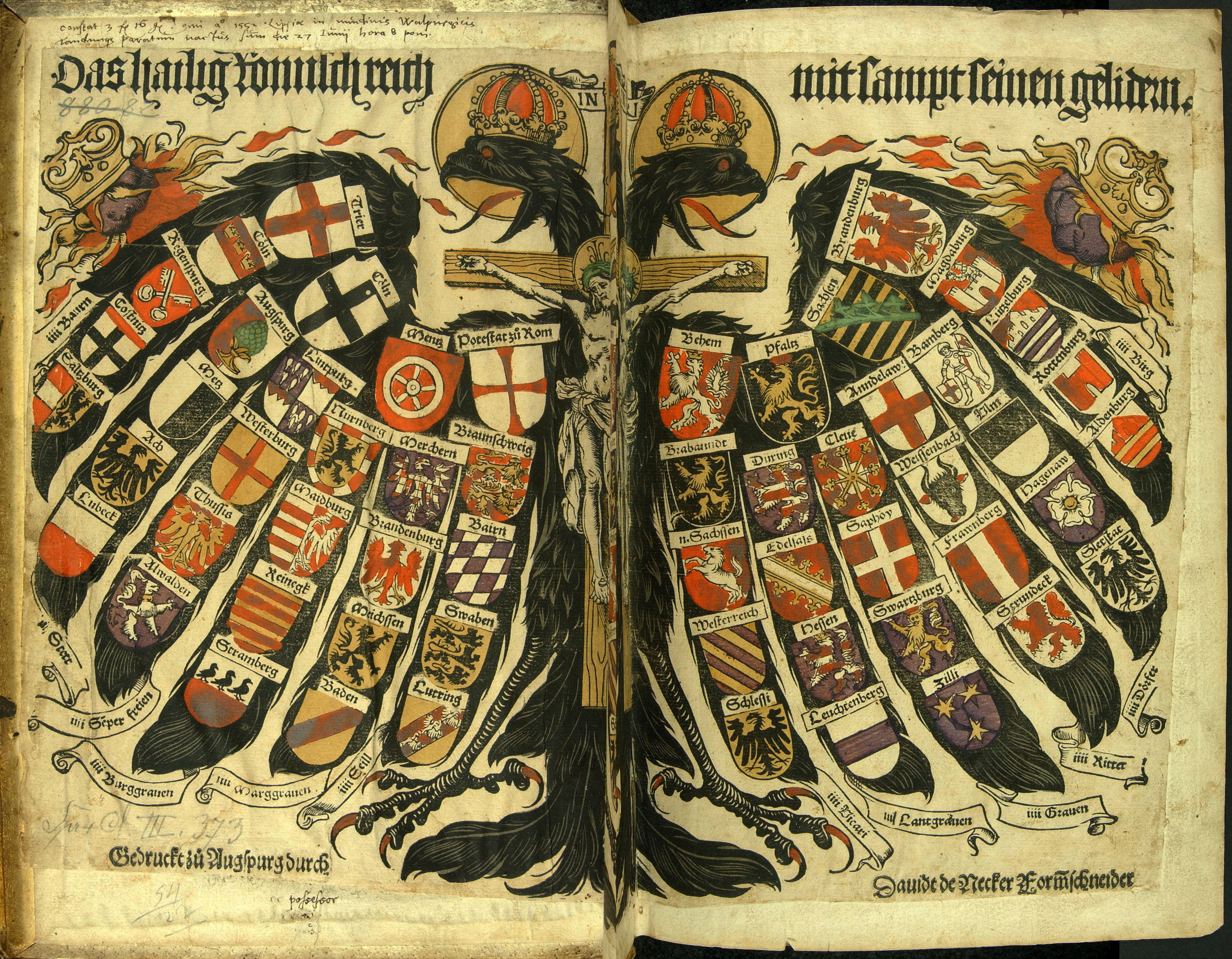
Woodcut by Hans Burgkmair, c. 1510, cut by Jost de Negker, this hand-coloured impression printed by his son David some decades later - woodcut blocks, if looked after, have a very long life.

Jost de Negker (c. 1485–1544) was a cutter of woodcuts and also a printer and publisher of prints during the early 16th century, mostly in Augsburg, Germany. He was a leading "formschneider" or blockcutter of his day, but always to the design of an artist. He is "closely tied to the evolution of the fine woodcut in Northern Europe". For Adam von Bartsch, although he did not usually design or draw, the quality of his work, along with that of Hans Lützelburger and Hieronymus Andreae, was such that he should be considered as an artist. Some prints where the designer is unknown are described as by de Negker, but it is assumed there was an artist who drew the design, although it has been suggested that de Negker might fill in a landscape background to a drawing of a figure.

Born in Antwerp c.1485, he worked as a cutter in the Netherlands to 1508, when a print he cut by Lucas van Leyden was published. He probably moved in that year to Augsburg (certainly before 1512) and worked for Maximilian I, Holy Roman Emperor on his print projects, as well as cutting blocks from designs by Hans Burgkmair the Elder and others. He was probably not used by Burgkmair in 1508 on his first chiaroscuro woodcut, for which precise cutting was essential to align the multiple blocks, but was working with him by 1510 on later works. Later states (in effect editions) of Burgkmair's two earliest chiaroscuro woodcuts, the equestrian portraits of Saint George and the Emperor Maximilian on horseback, and other Burgkmair prints, carry Negker's name and sometimes address, suggesting he owned the blocks, and was acting as publisher, though it is now thought that he may not have cut the earliest ones himself.

In 1512 de Negker wrote a long letter to the Emperor, in itself an indication of his status, which among other things makes it clear that he had been working on Maximilian's projects for some time, and had two assistants, paid via himself. As Maximilian's programme expanded, the signatures of eight different cutters are found on the reverse of blocks (surviving in the Albertina, Vienna) from 1516–18, including that of the other great cutter of the period, Hans Lützelburger. Negker still seems to have been the co-ordinator of the cutting side of the projects, though Albrecht Dürer brought in his own man, the difficult Hieronymus Andreae, for the Triumphal Arch. Giulia Bartrum says that the "Imperial commissions enabled the block-cutter and printer Jost de Negker to raise the status of his profession to an unprecedentedly high level."

On Maximilian's death in 1519, the large teams assembled for his projects dispersed, and de Negker became as much a publisher as a cutter, retaining many blocks by Burgkmair, Hans Weiditz and others, and infringing many works such as the Dance of Death by Holbein, Lützelburger's masterpiece as a cutter. Negker's edition of this was published in 1544, and is his last known work.

The cutters of most "single-leaf" woodcuts (prints) produced at the period are unknown, as they were usually only credited on the printed piece if they also acted as publisher, or at least printer. If the original block has survived these may be marked or signed, as they normally were in the case of Maximilian's projects, to ensure the right cutter was paid from the large teams.

In the absence of other evidence, it is not usually worthwhile to speculate on the identity of a cutter based on style or quality, so many single prints cut by Negker during these years probably remain untraceable in the large production of the period. With books there is more evidence, from title-pages. He is attributed with the cutting of the German chiaroscuro woodcut with the largest number of different colour blocks, a seven-block coat of arms by Hans Weiditz (1520) used as a book frontispiece.

Jost de Negker's business was continued until at least the mid 1560s by his son David de Negker, who inherited his blocks and after leaving Augsburg also worked in Leipzig and Vienna. Another (presumed) son, Samson, also cut blocks.

== Notes ==
=== References ===
- Bartrum, Giulia; German Renaissance Prints, 1490-1550; British Museum Press, 1995, ISBN 0-7141-2604-7
- David Landau & Peter Parshall, The Renaissance Print, Yale, 1996, ISBN 0-300-06883-2
- Mark McDonald, Ferdinand Columbus, Renaissance Collector, 2005, British Museum Press, ISBN 978-0-7141-2644-9.
- Gert von der Osten & Horst Vey 'Painting and Sculpture in Germany and the Netherlands' 1969.
- Thieme-Becker Kunstler Lexicon.
- Woods, Kim, Making Renaissance Art: Renaissance Art Reconsidered, Yale University Press, 2007, ISBN 0-300-12189-X, ISBN 978-0-300-12189-6. Google Books (summary of Landau & Parshall, available online)
