= Jacob Faber =

16th-century Swiss engraver and publisher

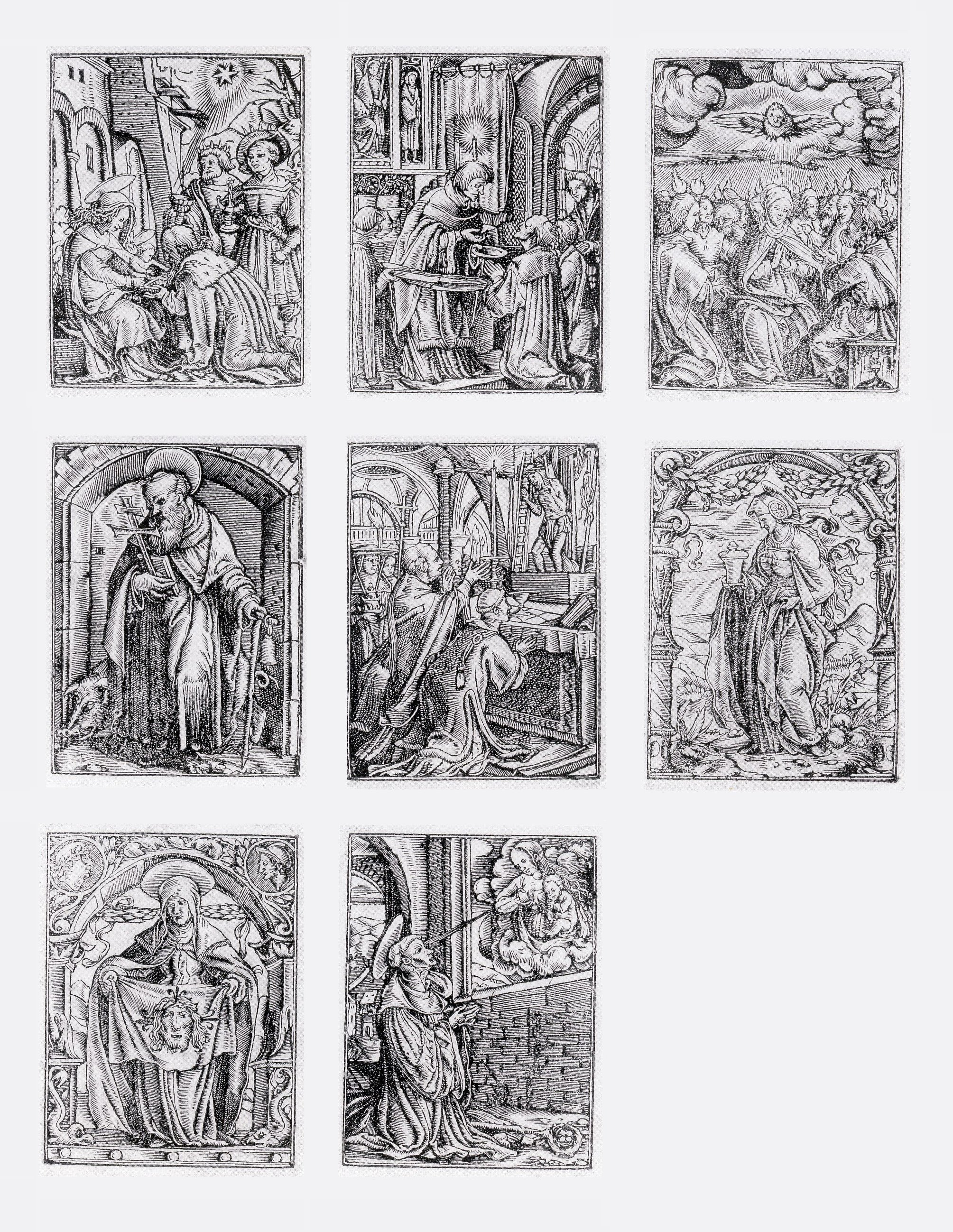
Eight metalcut illustrations for a Hortulus Animae, by Hans Holbein the Younger, cut by Jacob Faber.

Jacob Faber or Jakob Faber, also known as the "Master IF" from the monogram on his prints, was a formschneider ("block-cutter") of woodcuts and metalcuts, engraver, designer of decorative prints (alphabets, borders etc.) and publisher. Faber was active in the period 1516–1550, in Basel in Switzerland and subsequently in France.

Jacob Faber is a German form of what was presumably his original name, Jacques Lefèvre, a common French name – the equivalent of John Smith – shared by several other figures active in similar circles at the period; the main ones are mentioned below. Faber was especially noted for the many metalcut title-page borders and book illustrations he made to designs by Hans Holbein the Younger in Basel in the 1520s.

== Life ==
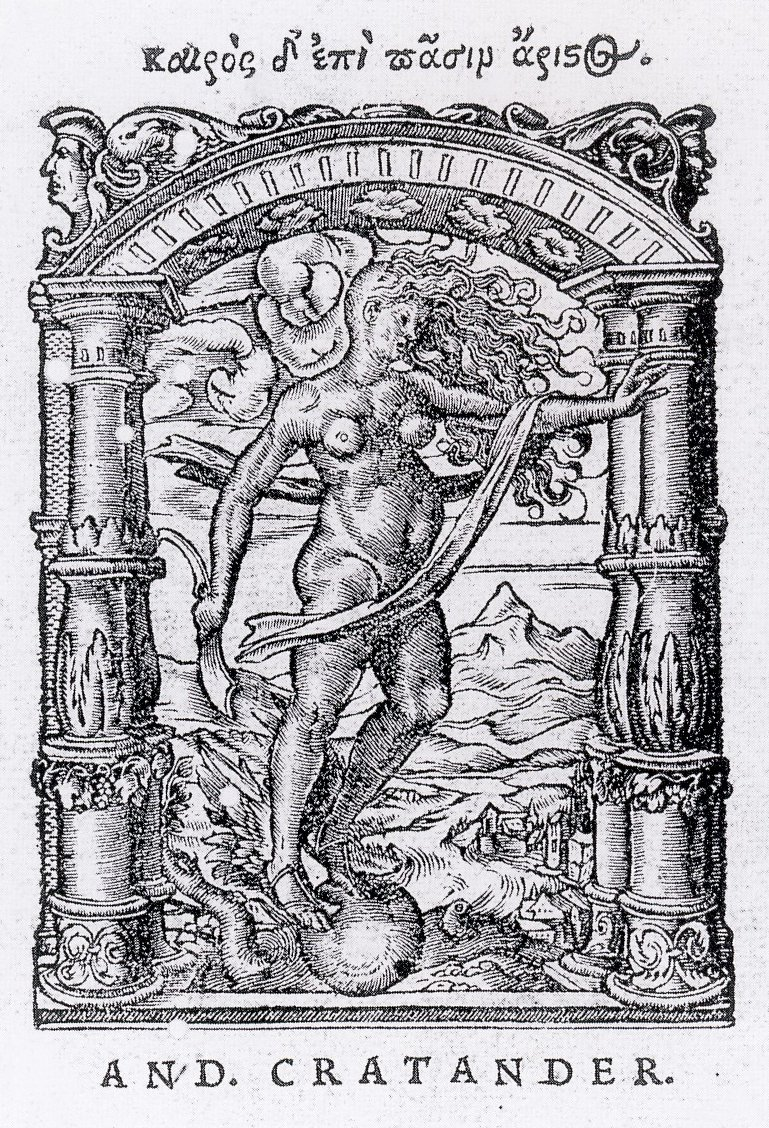
Printer's Device for Andreas Cratander, by Holbein, cut by Faber. 1522

Faber was born in France or Lorraine, the latter information coming from a reference in a letter by Erasmus of 1524. Possibly after training in Paris, he was in Basel in Switzerland working for Johann Froben by March 1516, and remained there until returning to France in 1524, to Paris and perhaps later Lyons, where he was used by the local publishers in the 1540s. He was associated with major Reformation figures, and may have become a Huguenot himself, which would agree with a move to Lyons, unlike Paris a city with a strong Huguenot presence. He may be the "Jacques Lefèvre, dit le tailleur d'histoires" ("called the cutter of stories") accused of heresy in Paris in 1534–35, but unlike 17 others at the time, not executed. He seems to have lived until about 1550.

The "enterprising" and mobile Faber undertook a variety of roles, but all were essentially within the book publishing industry; almost all his images are for books. He produced illustrations himself in all three techniques then used for book illustration: woodcut, engraving and metalcut, but appears always to have used the designs of artists, except perhaps for decorative work. He was the main producer of metalcut plates for the important publisher Johann Froben in Basel. He acted as a middle-man for larger publishers, according to Peter Parshall, and "eventually operated as an independent agent commissioning and trading blocks and plates with French and Swiss publishers". In this capacity he worked with Hans Holbein, Hans Lützelburger, and others. He was "also in close contact with major figures in the Reformation movement".

His habit of signing merely with his initials ensured that his identity sank into obscurity, until he was identified again in the mid-19th century and eventually recognized as the major interpreter of the younger Holbein's designs in the medium of metalcuts, though when left to his own devices, his abilities as a designer were mediocre - "wretched stuff", according to Campbell Dodgson, Keeper of Prints at the British Museum.

== Metalcuts ==
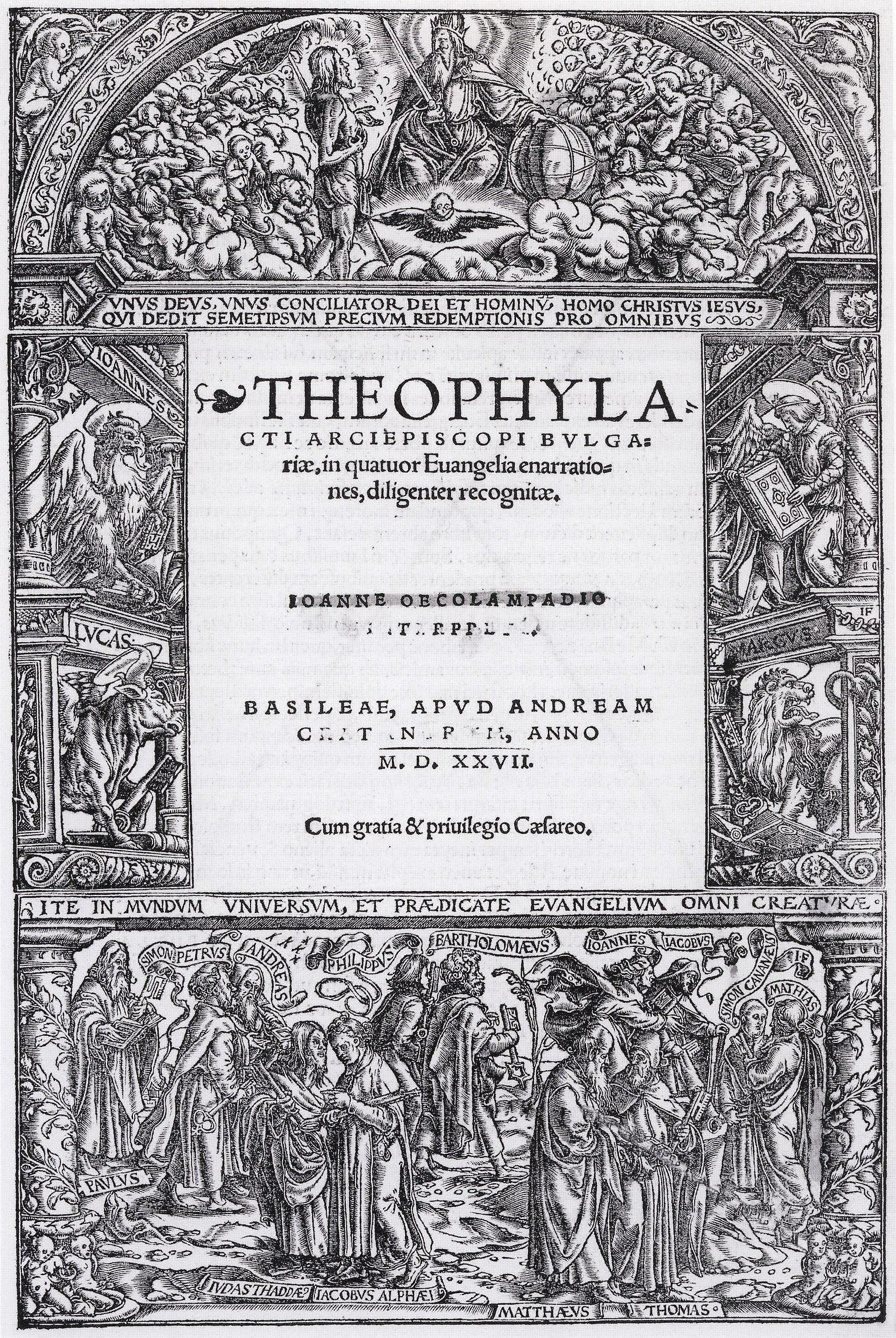
Christ as Intercessor, title page border by Hans Holbein the Younger, metalcut by Jacob Faber, 1523, signed "IF" at right edge, halfway up.

The earliest known metalcut produced in Basel is from a book printed by Froben in 1518, when Faber had already been working for Froben for two years; this is very likely to be by Faber, who in any case soon became Froben's main cutter in metal. Between 1520 and 1523, Faber executed metalcuts designed by Hans Holbein the Younger, at first exclusively. His early technique was relatively crude, using long parallel hatching lines for shadows that took little account of the volumes of figures and space. However, his work improved rapidly, presumably for two reasons. Firstly, Holbein, who was himself progressing markedly in his grasp of printmaking, probably took a closer personal interest in Faber's execution, after at first merely handing over his designs and leaving the style to the cutter. Secondly, the skilled woodcutter Hans Lützelburger arrived in Basel in 1522, bringing with him technical and artistic standards that may have stimulated Faber's own work. Lützelburger possessed a technique capable of doing justice for the first time to Holbein's highly detailed and challenging designs.

Faber's metalcut of the Title Page Border with Children and an Old Couple deployed shorter and more varied hatching than that of his earliest work, resulting in a greater roundness of forms. His progress continued in the Title Page Border with Tantalus, which distinguished between surface textures. Faber also began placing light and shadow more calculatingly, achieving enhanced visual and spatial effects. His heightened conception of space showed itself in his Title Page Border with Greek and Roman Philosophers and Authors of Antiquity in 1522 and reached a peak in the last metalcut he executed for Holbein in Basel, the Title Page Border with Christ as Intercessor before God the Father, the Four Symbols of the Evangelists and the Mission of the Apostles, in 1523. A metalcut of King Henry VIII in council, once said to be after Holbein, signed "IF", was used in English books, first appearing in 1548 in Hall's chronicle and subsequently being used in Foxe's Book of Martyrs.

Faber and other metalcutters may have influenced Lützelburger in turn, challenging him to further refine his technique. The metalcut possessed an advantage over the woodcut in close hatching because fine print lines between the furrows in the wood would sometimes break, marring the print. Lützelburger responded with technical advances of his own, achieving a greater subtlety in the woodcut medium. This period was one of revolution in all aspects of printmaking in Basel.

== Other Jacob Fabers in the Northern Renaissance ==
The name Jakob or Jacob Faber may mean several people, especially in the context of the Northern Renaissance, when at least three figures known by this name were active at the same time.

- Jacques Lefèvre d'Étaples, (c.1455-1536) French Renaissance humanist and theologian, called "of Etaples" to avoid confusion with the others, and often referred to by the hybrid German-Latin name "Jacob" or "Jakob Faber Stapulensis". He had a sometimes tense relationship with Erasmus, whose work on Biblical translation and in theology closely paralleled his own.
- Jacques Lefèvre/Jacob Faber, of Deventer, (1473-after 1517), a Netherlandish Renaissance humanist and friend and correspondent of Erasmus, and of Jacques Lefèvre d'Étaples. He worked most of his life as a schoolmaster.
- Jakob Faber, an alchemist working in Bohemia in 1585.
