= Hans Burgkmair =

German painter and woodcut printmaker (1473–1531)

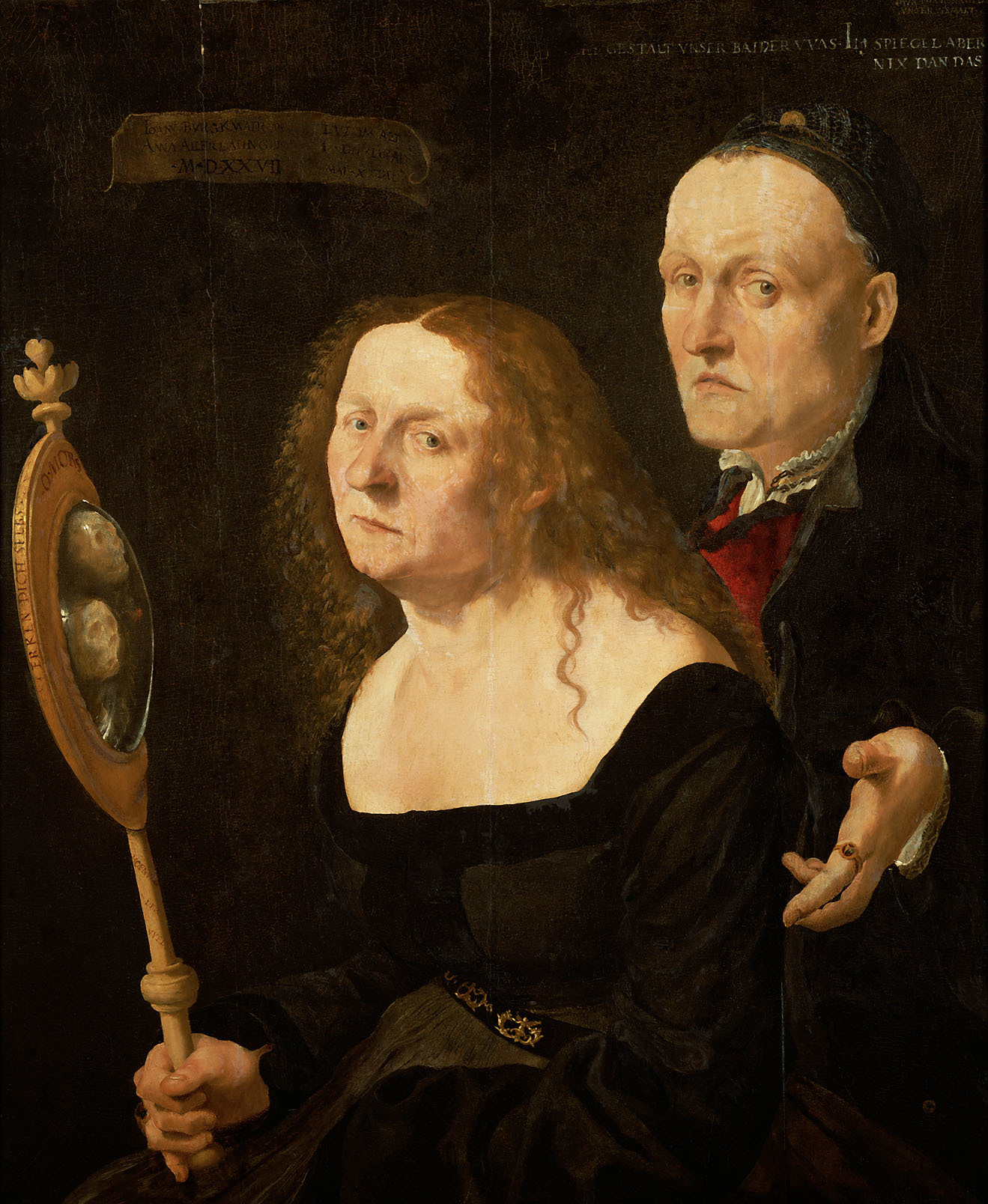
- The painter Hans Burgkmair and his wife Anna (painting by Lukas Furtenagel, 1529)
- Born: 1473; Augsburg, Germany
- Died: 1531 (aged 57–58); Augsburg, Germany
- Known for: Painting, printmaking, woodcut

Hans Burgkmair the Elder (1473–1531) was a German painter and woodcut printmaker.

== Background ==
Hans Burgkmair was born in Augsburg, the son of painter Thomas Burgkmair. His own son, Hans the Younger, later became a painter as well. From 1488, Burgkmair was a pupil of Martin Schongauer in Colmar. Schongauer died in 1491, before Burgkmair was able to complete the normal period of training. He may have visited Italy at this time, and certainly did so in 1507, which greatly influenced his style. From 1491, he worked in Augsburg, where he became a master and eventually opened his own workshop in 1498. Burgkmair was a Lutheran.

== Career ==
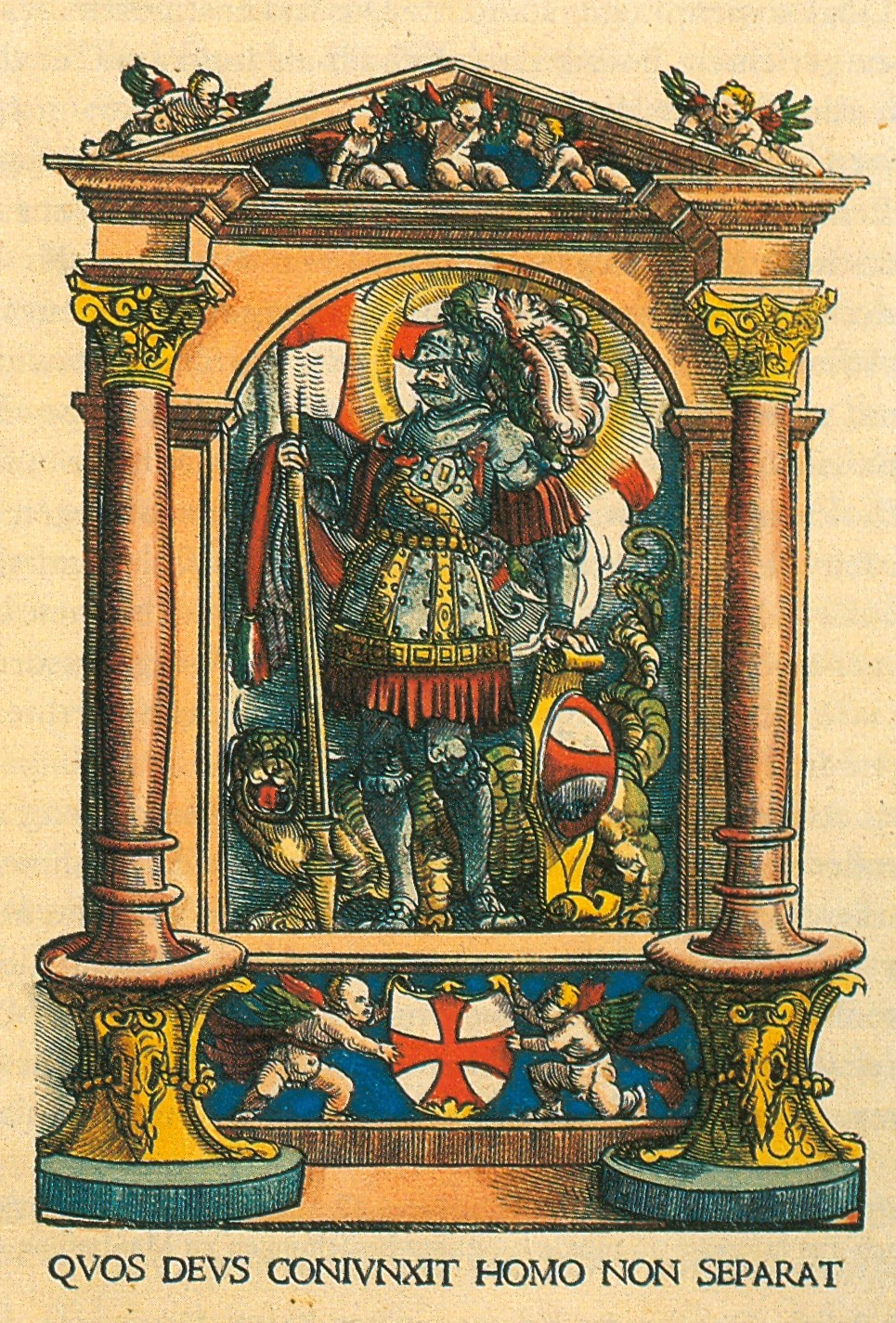
Burgkmair's 1522 colored woodcut of the Coat of arms of the Swabian League, with a flag of St. George. Two putti support a red cross in a white field; the motto: What God has joined let man not separate.

German art historian Friedrich Wilhelm Hollstein ascribes 834 woodcuts to Burgkmair, the majority of which were intended for book illustrations. Slightly more than a hundred are "single-leaf" prints which were not intended for books. His work shows a talent for striking compositions which blend Italian Renaissance forms with the established German style.

From about 1508, Burgkmair spent much of his time working on the woodcut projects of Maximilian I until the Emperor's death in 1519. He was responsible for nearly half of the 135 prints in the Triumphs of Maximilian, which are large and full of character. He also did most of the illustrations for Weisskunig and much of Theuerdank. He worked closely with the leading blockcutter Jost de Negker, who became in effect his publisher.

He was an important innovator of the chiaroscuro woodcut, and seems to have been the first to use a tone block, in a print of 1508. His Lovers Surprised by Death (1510) is the first chiaroscuro print to use three blocks, and also the first print that was designed to be printed only in colour, as the line block by itself would not make a satisfactory image. Other chiaroscuro prints from around this date by Baldung and Cranach had line blocks that could be and were printed by themselves. He produced one etching, Venus and Mercury (c1520), etched on a steel plate, but never tried engraving, despite his training with Schongauer.

Burgkmair was also a successful painter, mainly of religious scenes, portraits of Augsburg citizens, and members of the Emperor's court. Many examples of his work are in the galleries of Munich, Vienna and elsewhere.

Burgkmair died at Augsburg in 1531.

=== Burgkmair and the foundation of modern ethnology ===
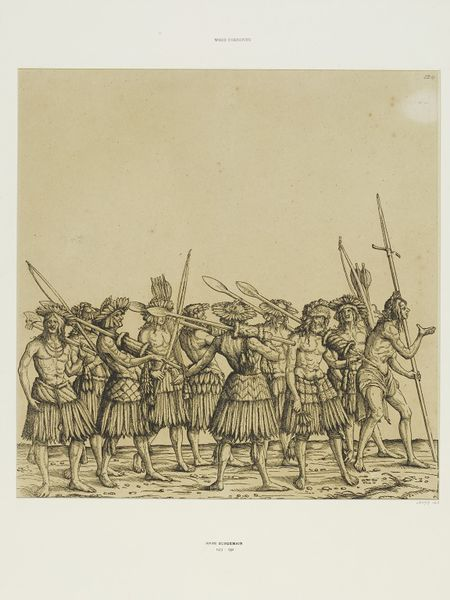
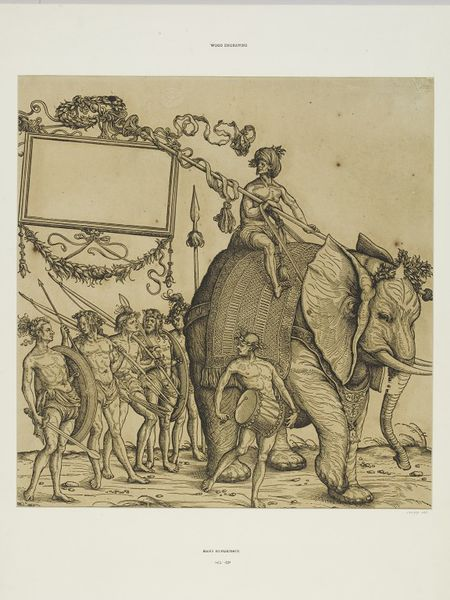
People of Calicut, from the Triumphal Procession
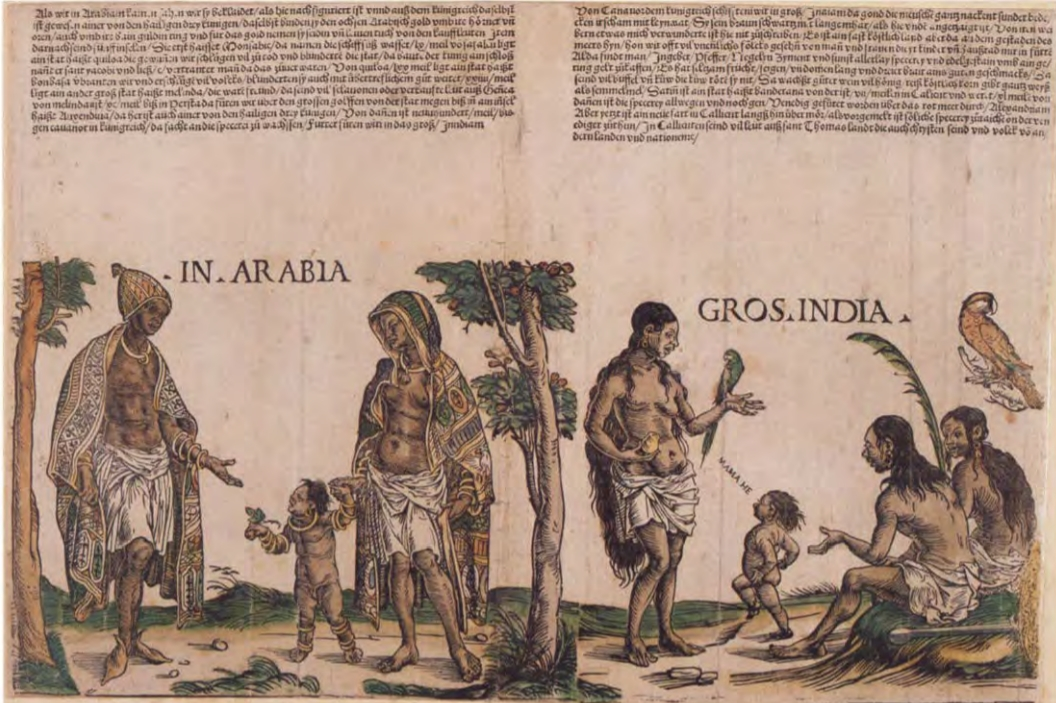
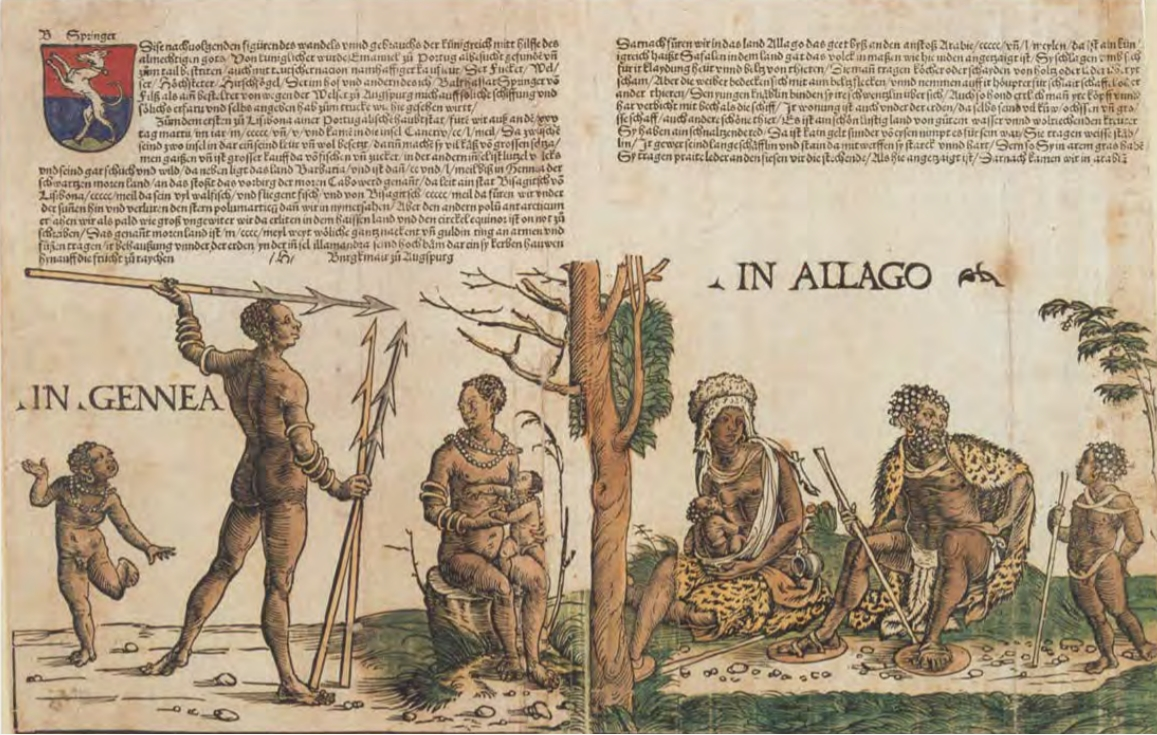
Peoples of Africa and India series (1508)

Burgkmair's time was a period of development for ethnography and the new Humanist science of chorography (promoted by Conrad Celtes at the University of Vienna). Using commercial ventures of the Welsers in Augsburg as a pretext, the humanist Konrad Peutinger goaded Emperor Maximilian into backing his ethnographical interests in the Indians and supporting the 1505–1506 voyage of Balthasar Springer around Africa to India. Based on an instruction dictated by Maximilian in 1512 regarding Indians in the Triumphal Procession, Jörg Kölderer executed a series of (now lost) drawings, which served as the guideline for Altdorfer's miniatures in 1513–1515, which in turn became the model for woodcuts (half of them based on now lost 1516–1518 drawings by Burgkmair) showing "the people of Calicut." In 1508, Burgkmair produced the People of Africa and India series, focusing on depicting the peoples whom Springer encountered along coastal Africa and India. The series brought into being "a basic set of analytic categories that ethnography would take as its methodological foundation".

== Gallery ==
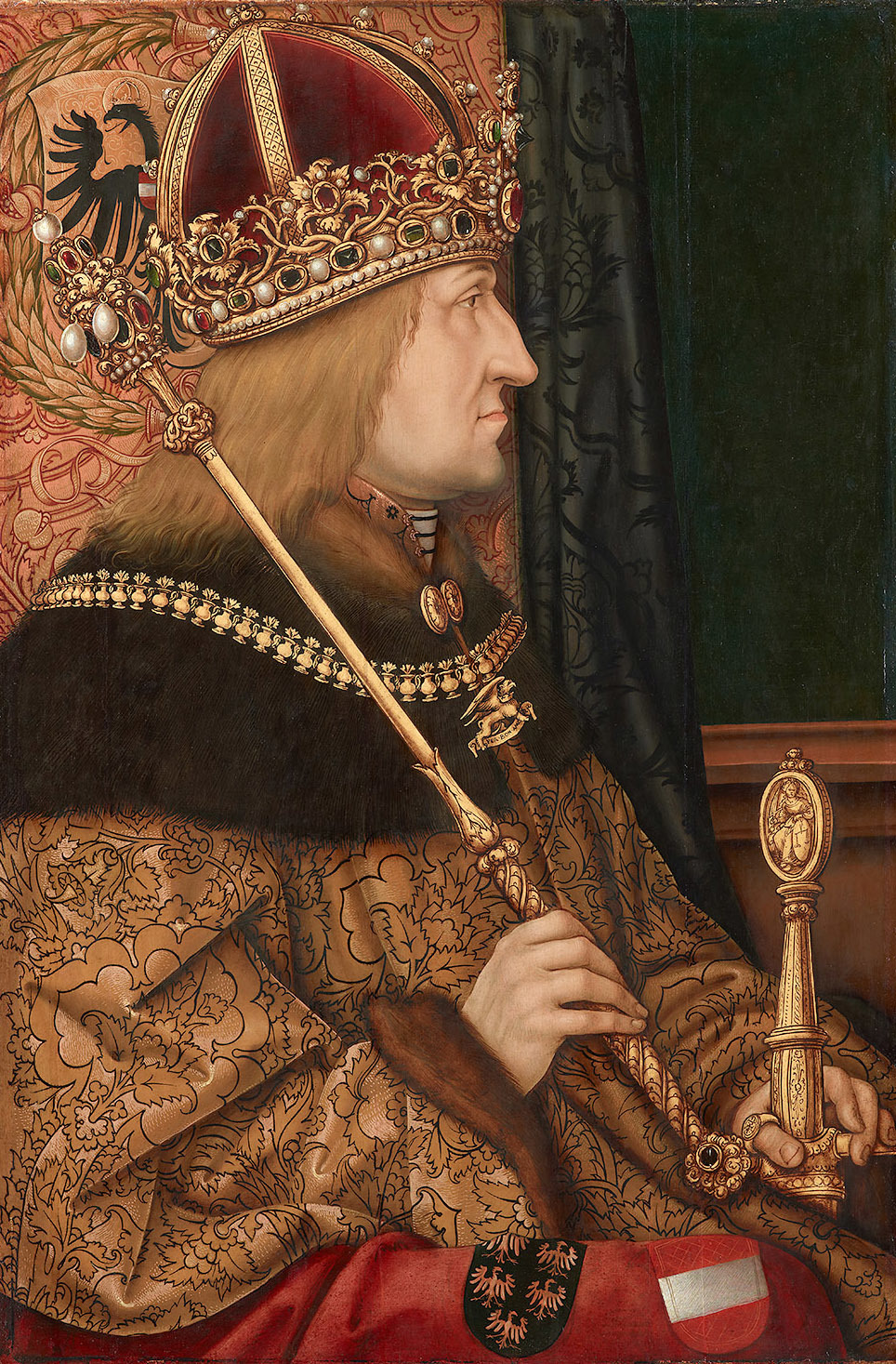
Emperor Frederick III

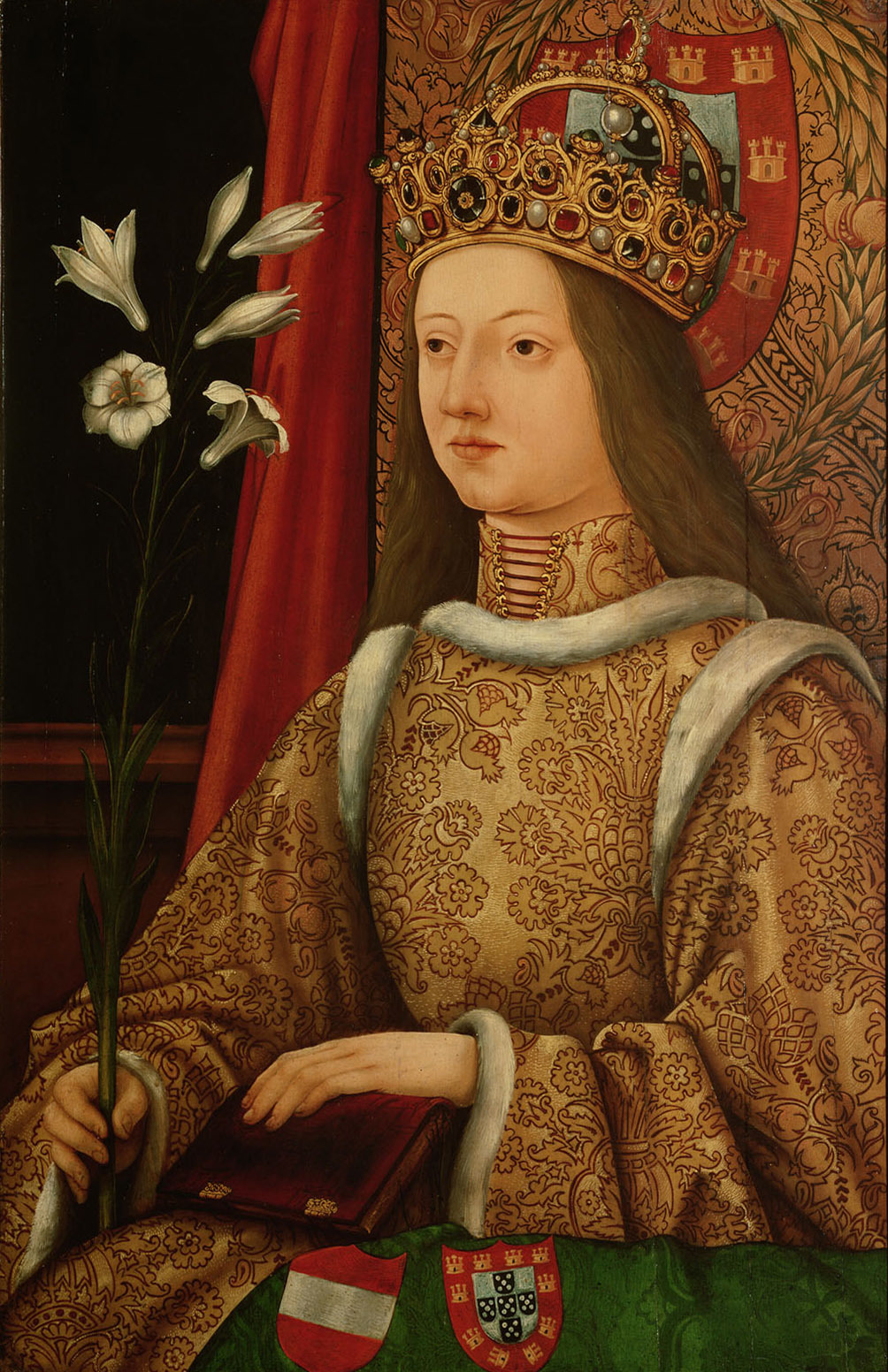
Eleanor of Portugal, Holy Roman Empress

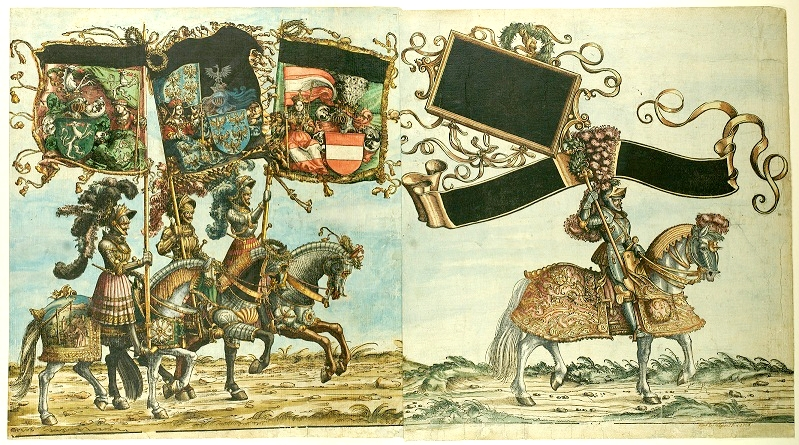
Print in the Triumphs of Maximilian

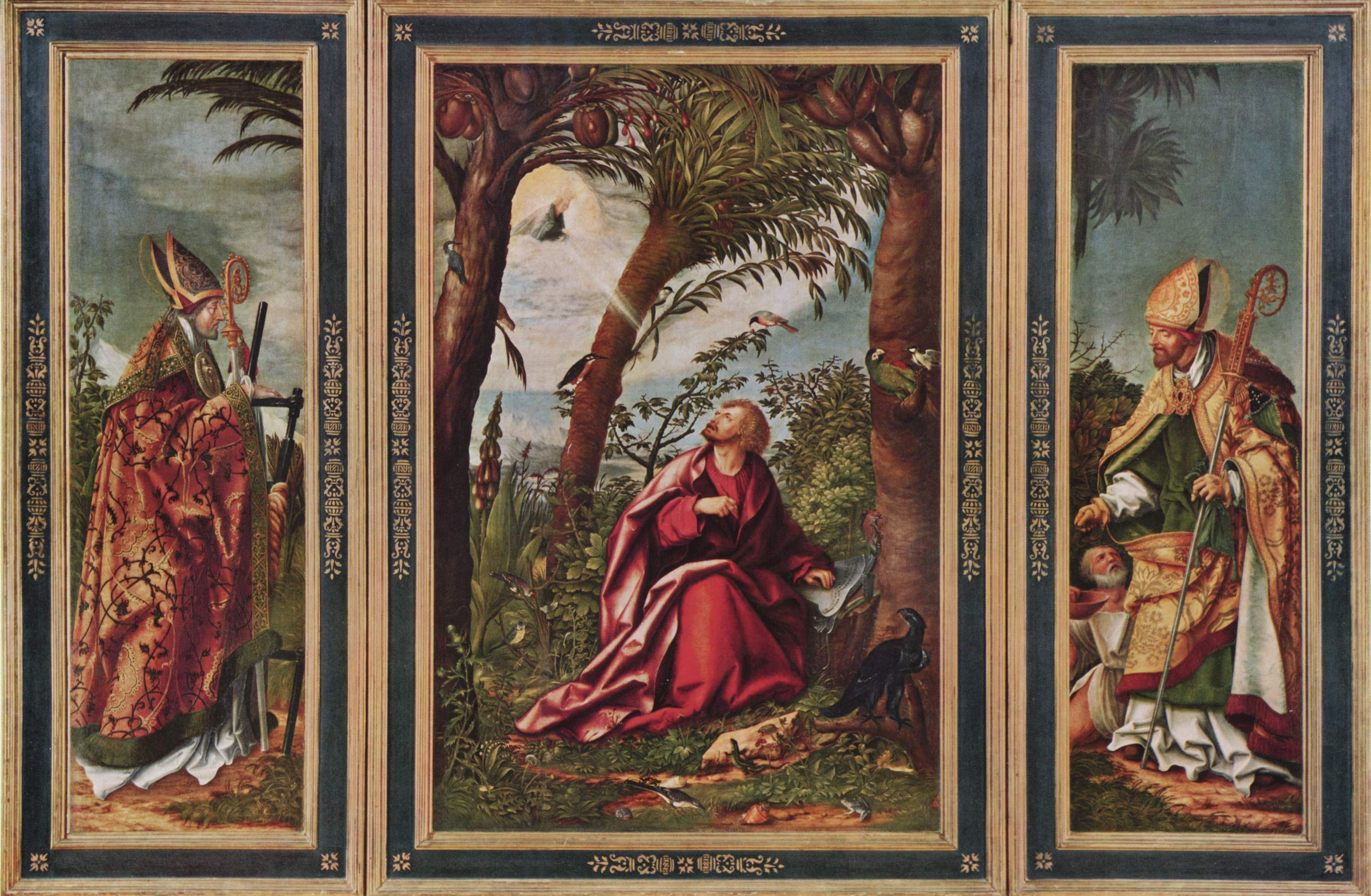
Altarpiece of John the Evangelist, 1518 (Alte Pinakothek)

== See also ==
- German Renaissance
- Quaternion Eagle
