= Metalcut =

Early printmaking technique

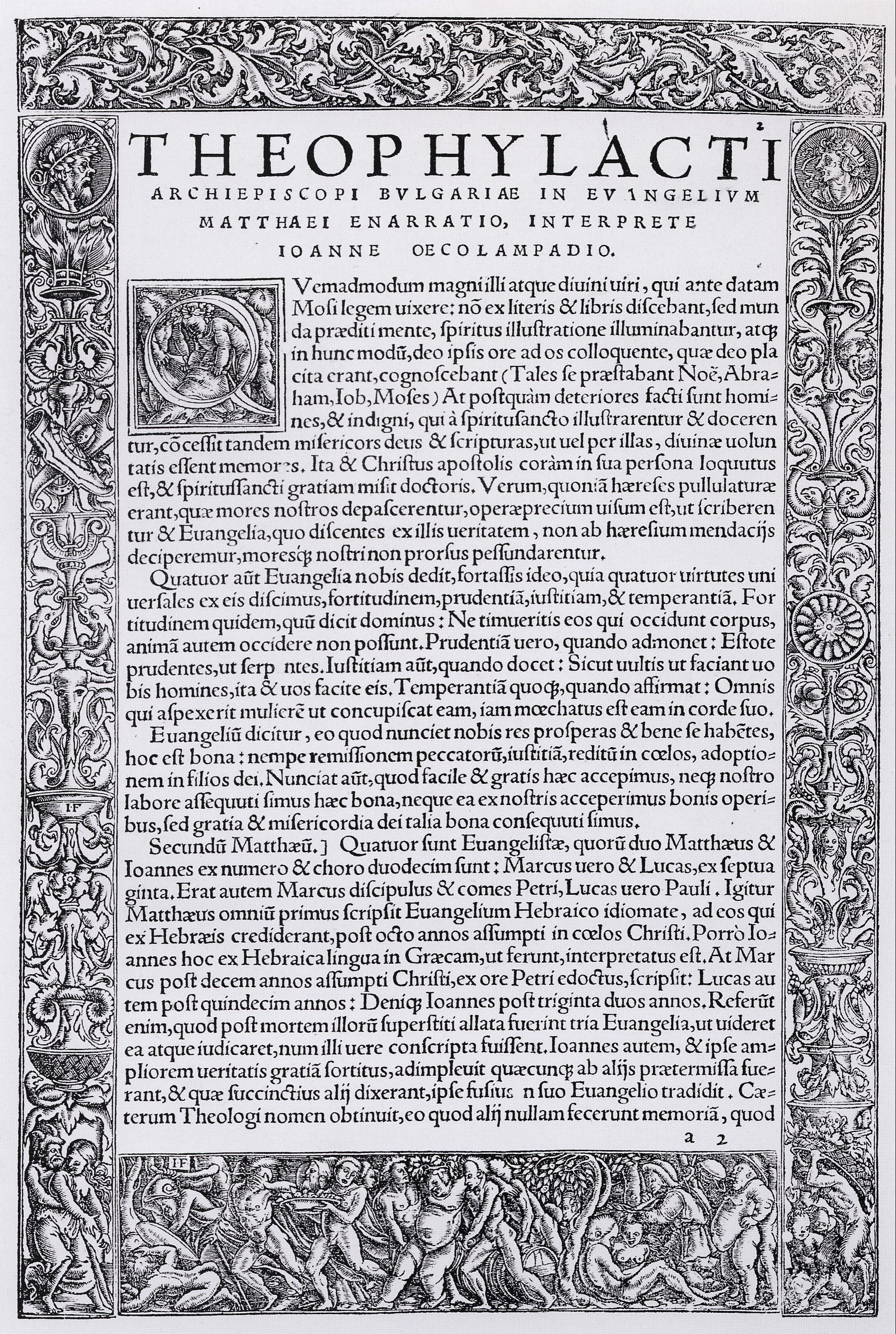
Page border by Hans Holbein the Younger; revival of the first technique.

Metalcut was a relief printmaking technique, belonging to the category of old master prints. It was almost entirely restricted to the period from about 1450 to 1540, and mostly to the region around the Rhine in Northern Europe, the Low Countries, Germany, France and Switzerland; the technique perhaps originated in the area around Cologne.

== Technique ==
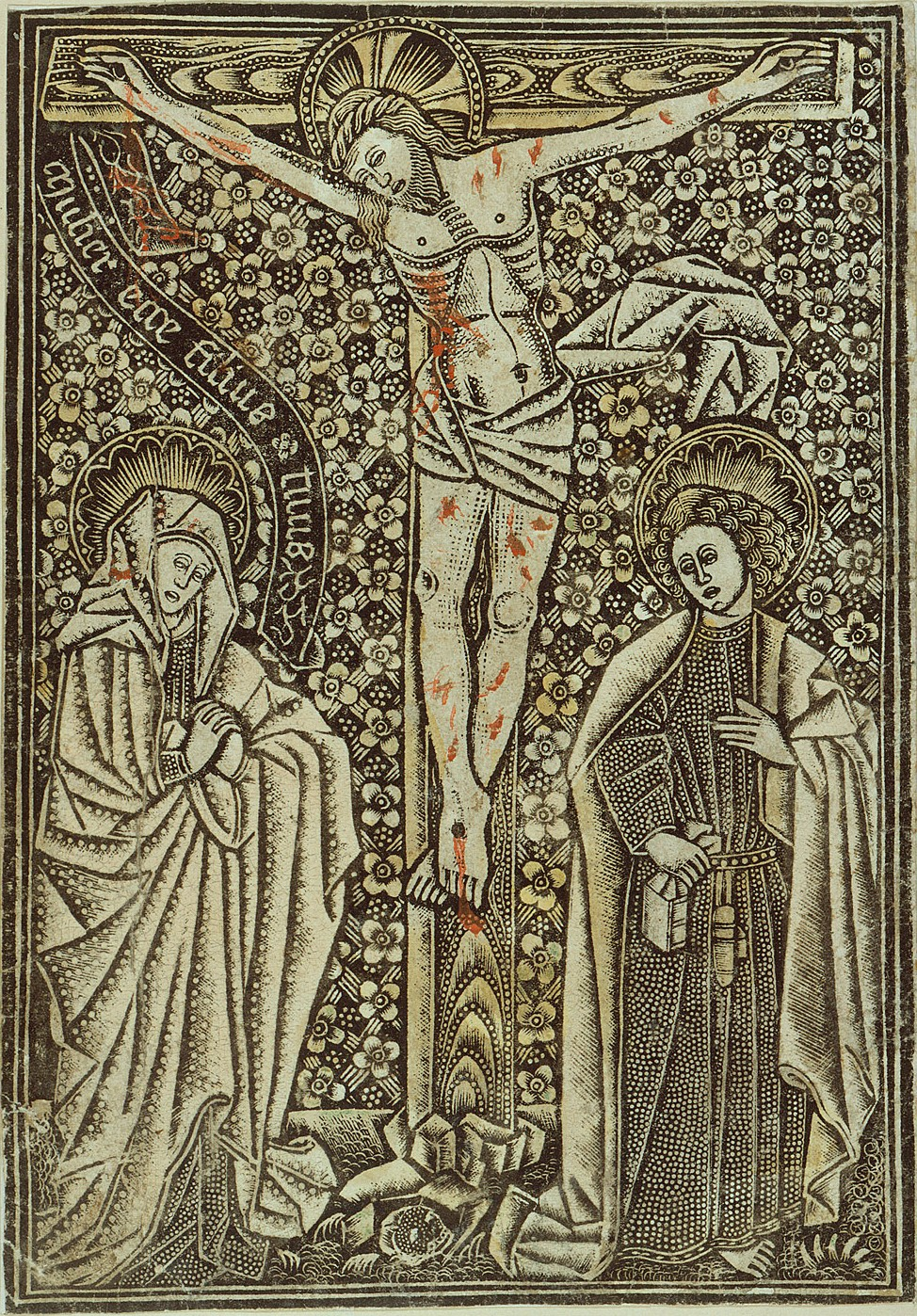
German "dotted manner" print, partly with added colours, 15th century

There were two different techniques for making metalcut prints, with very different results.

The first technique is essentially that of woodcut but using a thin metal plate rather than a wooden block. The areas not to print are cut away, or hammered back with punches. These prints look very much like normal woodcuts of the period, and it can sometimes be hard for experts to tell them apart. The subject matter is almost entirely religious in the early period, which mostly consists of single prints for display or collecting, and mostly ornamental in the 16th century revival, which mostly consists of illustrations and borders for books. There was a late flowering of the original method around 1500 in France, with a series of lavish Books of Hours. In the sixteenth century the technique continued to be used for elaborate borders and initial letters in books, notably by Jacob Faber, who often used designs by Hans Holbein the Younger.

The second technique, was introduced in the second half of the 15th century and worked from black to white, meaning that the print showed white lines on a black background, rather than the other way round as in the first technique. Again prints were nearly always on religious subjects. Usually the main lines of the figures and landscape were done in engraving. Then using metalwork punches, the rest of the image is composed of repeated use of the same pattern of punch in a particular area. These might be dots, circles, lozenges, stars, letters making text inscriptions, or more complicated shapes for the borders. Usually very little space is left undecorated; and this technique is easy to recognise. These prints ceased to be produced about 1500. The plates themselves may have been treated as works of art in plaque form, with printed impressions a useful by-product; in some cases inscriptions print in reverse, though others do not. Some copper plates survive, often with nail-holes at the corners.

As with the other contemporary print techniques, very few metal cut prints have survived. Prints made by the second technique are sometimes called prints in the dotted manner, or dotted prints, Schrotblatt in German and Manière criblée in French.

It was also possible to combine the techniques on the same plate, with figures using black lines, and backgrounds with punched white dots on a black background. French printed books of hours from the end of the century often use such combinations.

== Practitioners ==
Despite the limitations of the technique, many of the artists who used the second technique were very talented, and the best prints have considerable power. Compared to contemporary engravings and woodcuts, they were usually large, as the technique needed space on the plate. No names are known of the artists; presumably most of them were trained as goldsmiths, as the punch shapes used were typical ones from goldsmithing.

== See also ==
- Old master print
- Popular prints
