= List of states in the Holy Roman Empire =

Historical evolution of the Holy Roman Empire overlaid on modern borders

This list of states in the Holy Roman Empire includes any territory ruled by an authority that had been granted imperial immediacy, as well as many other feudal entities such as lordships, sous-fiefs, and allodial fiefs.

The Holy Roman Empire was a complex political entity that existed in central Europe for most of the medieval and early modern periods and was generally ruled by a German-speaking Emperor. Some historians mark the beginning of the Empire as 800, with the coronation of Frankish king Charlemagne ("Charles the Great"). The states that composed the Empire, while enjoying a form of territorial authority called Landeshoheit that granted them many attributes of sovereignty, were never fully sovereign states in the sense that term is understood presently.

In the 18th century, the Holy Roman Empire consisted of approximately 1,800 such territories, the majority being tiny estates owned by the families of Imperial Knights. Not counting Imperial Knights' estates, there were some 294 states in 1792, made up of 243 states granted imperial immediacy and 51 Free Imperial Cities.

This page does not directly contain the list but discusses the format of the various lists and offers some background to understand the complex organisation of the Holy Roman Empire. The lists themselves can be accessed via the alphabetical navigation box below; each letter will lead the reader to a page on which states of the Empire that began with that letter are listed; Some states also don’t have an official flag in the Holy Roman Empire so coat of arms may be used instead.

== Table of states ==
While any such list could never be definitive, the list attempts to be as comprehensive as possible. It is sorted alphabetically and split into separate articles linked below. There is also a separate list of Free Imperial Cities and a list of participants in the Imperial Diet as of 1792.

- List of states in the Holy Roman Empire (A)
- List of states in the Holy Roman Empire (B)
- List of states in the Holy Roman Empire (C)
- List of states in the Holy Roman Empire (D)
- List of states in the Holy Roman Empire (E)
- List of states in the Holy Roman Empire (F)
- List of states in the Holy Roman Empire (G)
- List of states in the Holy Roman Empire (H)
- List of states in the Holy Roman Empire (I)
- List of states in the Holy Roman Empire (J)
- List of states in the Holy Roman Empire (K)
- List of states in the Holy Roman Empire (L)
- List of states in the Holy Roman Empire (M)
- List of states in the Holy Roman Empire (N)
- List of states in the Holy Roman Empire (O)
- List of states in the Holy Roman Empire (P)
- List of states in the Holy Roman Empire (Q)
- List of states in the Holy Roman Empire (R)
- List of states in the Holy Roman Empire (S)
- List of states in the Holy Roman Empire (T)
- List of states in the Holy Roman Empire (U)
- List of states in the Holy Roman Empire (V)
- List of states in the Holy Roman Empire (W)
- List of states in the Holy Roman Empire (Z)

=== Key ===
- The "Circle" column shows the Imperial Circle (Reichskreis) that the state belonged to.
- The "Bench" column shows where the state was represented in the Imperial Diet (Reichstag).

Circles		Benches
Aust	Austrian	EL	Council of Electors, the exclusive elite formally electing the Holy Roman Emperor
Bav	Bavarian	EC	Spiritual Bench of the Council of Princes (individual voice)
Burg	Burgundian	PR	Secular Bench of the Council of Princes (individual voice)
El Rhin	Electoral Rhenish Circle	RP	Rhenish prelates (Council of Princes)
Franc	Franconian	SP	Swabian prelates (Council of Princes)
Low Rhen	Lower Rhenish-Westphalian	FC	Franconian counts (Council of Princes)
Low Sax	Lower Saxon	SC	Swabian counts (Council of Princes)
Upp Rhen	Upper Rhenish	WE	Westphalian counts (Council of Princes)
Upp Sax	Upper Saxon	WT	Wetterau counts (Council of Princes)
Swab	Swabian	RH	Rhenish Bench of the Council of Imperial Cities
None	"Circle-free"	SW	Swabian Bench of the Council of Imperial Cities

Note that in the "Circle" column, "n/a" denotes a state that had ceased to exist before the Reichsreform.

Other abbreviations used in the list are:

- Abp. (Archbishopric)
- Bp. (Bishopric)
- Co. (County) (sometimes called countship)
- D. (Duchy) (sometimes called dukedom)
- Ldg. (Landgraviate)
- Mrg. (Margraviate)
- Pr. (Principality)
- RA (Reichsabtei) (Imperial abbacy, a monastery enjoying Imperial immediacy)

== Definition of terms ==
- Hochstift: the territory ruled by a bishop as a prince.
- Imperial Abbey (Reichsabtei): an abbey with imperial immediacy. Its head was a Reichsabt, literally 'Imperial Abbot' or 'Abbot of the Empire'. A monastery with similar status was a Reichskloster.
- Imperial Circle (Reichskreis, plural Reichskreise): a regional grouping of states of the Holy Roman Empire, primarily for the purpose of organising a common defence and of collecting imperial taxes, but also as a means of organisation within the Imperial Diet.
- Imperial Diet (Reichstag): the parliament of the Holy Roman Empire. The same name was used in the North German Confederation and in Germany until 1945.
- Imperial Estate (Reichsstand, plural Reichsstände): an entity in the Holy Roman Empire with a vote in the Imperial Diet. Several states had no seats in the Empire, while some officials (such as the Hereditary Usher) were non-voting members; neither qualified as Imperial States.
- Imperial Free City (freie Reichsstadt): a city formally responsible to the emperor only – as opposed to the majority of cities in the Empire, which belonged to the territory of one of the many princes (Fürsten) of the Empire, such as dukes or prince-bishops. Free cities also had independent representation in the Imperial Diet of the Holy Roman Empire.
- Imperial immediacy (Reichsfreiheit or Reichsunmittelbarkeit; adjectives reichsfrei, reichsunmittelbar) was a privileged feudal and political status, a form of statehood within the Holy Roman Empire. The ruler of an immediate city, abbey or territory had no overlord other than the Holy Roman Emperor and the Imperial Diet. Immediate states had the right to collect taxes and tolls themselves, and held juridical rights (including the Blutgericht, 'high' justice including capital punishment) themselves. De facto, immediacy corresponded to a semi-independence with a far-reaching autonomy.
- Imperial Reform: In 1495, an attempt was made at a Diet in the city of Worms to give the disintegrating Holy Roman Empire a new structure, commonly referred to as Imperial Reform (in German: Reichsreform).
- Imperial State (Reichsstand, plural Reichsstände): an entity in the Holy Roman Empire with a vote in the Imperial Diet.
- Kleinstaaterei is a German word mostly used to describe the territorial fragmentation in Germany and neighboring regions during the Holy Roman Empire (especially after the end of the Thirty Years' War). It refers to the large number of nearly sovereign small and medium-sized secular and ecclesiastical principalities and free imperial cities, some of which were little larger than a single town or the surrounding grounds of the monastery of an Imperial abbey.
- League of cities is Military alliance and mutual assistance strengthened the position of imperial cities, especially during the interregnum period of the 13th to 14th century.
- Mediatization is the loss of imperial immediacy through annexation by a larger state. A mediatized lord lost most of his power over his former territory, but retained his title and most of his personal privileges.
- Prince of the Empire: any ruling Prince whose territory is a member of the Holy Roman Empire (not only German-speaking countries, but also many bordering and extensive neighbouring regions) and entitled to a voting seat (or in a collective voting unit, such as a Grafenbank) in the Imperial Diet.
- Prince-abbot (Fürstabt) or prince-abbess (Äbtissin): an abbot or abbess with the rank of prince. Prince-abbots (but not prince-abbesses) had a seat and vote on the Ecclesiastical Bench of the College of Ruling Princes of the Imperial Diet, where they sat alongside the prince-bishops.
- Prince-bishop (Fürstbischof): a bishop with the rank, ex officio, of prince (Fürst). As a prince, he was the temporal ruler of a Hochstift; as a bishop, he exercised the spiritual duties of an ordinary bishop over his diocese, which was always larger than his Hochstift. Prince-bishops had seat and voice on the Ecclesiastical Bench of the College of Ruling Princes of the Imperial Diet. Nearly all the bishops of the Holy Roman Empire outside the Habsburg lands were prince-bishops.
- Prince-elector or electoral prince (Kurfürst, pl. Kurfürsten): a member of the electoral college of the Holy Roman Empire, having the function of electing the Holy Roman Emperors.
- Secularization: the transfer of property from ecclesiastical to civil possession or use.

== Notes column ==
The "Notes" column shows, in capsule form,

- the territorial development of the different states or polities (acquisition or loss of possessions, union of rulers or dynasties, etc.);
- the royal or noble dynasties, including their various branches, which ruled over territories or polities;
- the transmission of succession rights (marriage, female succession, conquest, cession, pledge, etc.);
- the attributes of "statehood" (right to mint coins, holding markets and fairs, entering into treaties and pacts, appointment of civil officials, etc.); and
- the size of territory and population of the various polities whenever these are available.

=== Estate of the Empire (Reichsstand) ===
The following excerpt from François Velde's Unequal and Morganatic Marriages in German Law provides an excellent overview on what an Estate (or State) of the Empire is. For his purpose, the author deals only with the hereditary territorial rulers but it should be remembered that the Estates also included a substantial number of non-hereditary territorial rulers such as the ecclesiastical states (prince-bishoprics and imperial abbeys) and free imperial cities.

The special status of these families manifested itself in the constitution of the Empire as it evolved in the 16th c. To the status of territorial ruler corresponded a seat and vote in one of the colleges of the Reichstag, the Imperial Diet. In the late 16th c., the multiplication of votes due to territorial fragmentation led to reforms. After the Diet held at Augsburg in 1582, the list of votes remained fixed, notwithstanding further territorial divisions. Furthermore, the right to vote became attached to a land, rather than to a person or family (of course, land was inheritable within families). A member of the Diet with seat and vote (individual or shared) was called a Reichsstand, or state of the Empire.

At some point (Abt 1911, 103 n2 cites various possible dates, from the turn of the 16th c. to 1653 to the 18th c.), the definition of Hochadel became congruent with being a Reichsstand (adjective: reichsständisch). The reason is that the Emperor, as "fons nobilitatium," had the power to create new princes, counts and barons of the Empire, a power which he began to use more frequently. The existing princes, counts and barons were obviously loath to see the value of their title diminished. The members of the Diet complained and, after 1582, it became the rule that such new princes and counts would not of right have a seat at the Diet. Furthermore, in 1653 the Electoral Capitulation included strict rules on the process by which the Emperor could create new states of the Empire. In particular, any new member had to possess an immediate territory of sufficient size, and had to be accepted by his peers (princes or counts).

Thus a distinction emerged between

1. families that were part of the Diet in 1582: the "old princely" and "old comital" (altfürstliche, altgräfliche) families
2. families who were admitted to the Diet between 1582 and 1803: the "new princely" (neufürstliche) and "new comital" (neugräfliche) families
3. families or individuals who received the title of Reichsfreiherr, Reichsgraf or Reichsfürst but were not admitted to the Diet

Only the first two groups were part of the Hochadel. Those in the third group were titular counts and princes but in no way accepted as part of the Hochadel.

Thus it would seem that having seat and vote in the Reichstag would be a clear criterion for belonging to the Hochadel. But there were further complications:

- In principle, the possession of a territory was a pre-condition for admission in the Diet. However, in the second half of the 18th century a number of counts sat on the counts' benches without any such territory. They were called "personalists" because they had been admitted on a personal basis (ad personam), and some jurists did not consider them to be part of the upper nobility (e.g., Pütter 1795, 143).
- Possession of a large immediate territory was a condition for entry, but not a condition for remaining in the Diet. It happened that territories became subjected to another state of the Empire, thus losing immediate status; yet the owner remained in the Diet.

Consequently, whereas, in the 16th century, it was fairly easy to say who was in the upper nobility and who wasn't, it had become more difficult by the turn of the 19th century.

Three concepts came into play:

1. immediacy (Reichsunmittelbarkeit),
2. sovereignty over a territory (Landeshoheit),
3. a seat and vote at the Imperial Diet (Reichsstandschaft).

The three were "usually" related, in that the sovereign of a territory was a state of the Empire, and a state of the Empire usually had sovereignty over an immediate territory; but there were exceptions both ways. Various authors emphasized one or a combination of these elements. Thus, Runde (1791) required all three; Pütter emphasized sovereignty; Gönner and Leist emphasized seat and vote at the Diet. Among 19th century authors, the main division was between those who required all three criteria, and those who considered Reichsstandschaft to be the sole criterion (Hohler, Klüber, Zoepf, Rehm).

Using the second, slightly broader concept, at the end of the 18th century the high nobility consisted of those families which had seat and vote at the Imperial Diet, with title of either prince or count (the last baronial family died out in 1775), numbering about 25 princely (fürstliche) and 80 comital (gräfliche) families.

== Grouped lists ==
The following lists are going to be included into the table above.

=== Ecclesiastical orders ===
- The Teutonic Order
  1529: College of Princes
  1793: Council of Princes
- The Order of St. John
  1793: Council of Princes

=== Livonian territories ===
- Terra Mariana (the Livonian Confederation from 1435):
  - Archbishopric of Riga (from 1207, as Bishopric of Riga until 1255, subjugated directly to the Holy See in 1215, again from 1225, secularized and subjugated to the Kingdom of Poland and Grand Duchy of Lithuania in 1561)
  - Livonian Order (secularized 16th century, secularized and subjugated to the Kingdom of Poland and Grand Duchy of Lithuania in 1561)
  - Bishopric of Dorpat (from 1225, conquered by Russia in 1558)
  - Bishopric of Ösel-Wiek (from 1228, sold to Denmark in 1560)
  - Bishopric of Courland (from 1521, sold to Denmark in 1560)
  - Roman Catholic Diocese of Reval (from 1521, incorporated into Sweden in 1561)
  - Riga (from 1581, in effect in 1582, incorporated into the Polish–Lithuanian Duchy of Livonia in 1581)

=== Territories of old princely families ===
- Holstein-Gottorp
  - Holstein-Gottorp-Oldenburg
- Holstein-Glückstadt
- Ernestine duchies

=== Italian territories ===
- Carrara
- Finale
- Florence
- Genoa
- Guastalla
- Lucca
- Mantua
- Massa
- Milan
- Modena and Reggio
- Montferrat
- Parma
- Piedmont
- Piombino
- Saluzzo
- Siena
- Tuscany
- Verona

=== Territories of new princely families ===
- Thurn und Taxis, held Friedberg-Scheer (1754)

=== Religious leagues ===
- Catholic League
- Heilbronn League
- League of Torgau
- Protestant Union
- Schmalkaldic League

=== Political leagues ===
- Fürstenbund
- Old Swiss Confederacy (until 1648)

== See also ==
- List of Imperial Diet participants (1792)
- List of historic states of Germany (after 1815)

== Maps and illustrations ==
- Höckmann, Thomas (2006). "Historical maps – Germany at the end of the 18th century". . Retrieved June 26, 2006.
- Westermann, Großer Atlass zu Weltgeschichte (in German; exquisite detailed maps)
