= List of states in the Holy Roman Empire (Z) =

This is a list of states in the Holy Roman Empire beginning with the letter Z. Some historians mark the beginning of the Empire as 800, with the coronation of Frankish king Charlemagne ("Charles the Great").

Name	Type	Imperial circle	Imperial diet	History
Zähringen	Duchy	n/a	n/a	962: First mentioned; Gau Counts in the Breisgau; 1092: Claimed the Duchy of Swabia; 1098: Renounced Swabia; assumed the title Duke of Zähringen; 1112: Side line Baden founded 1152: Partitioned into itself and Teck; 1218: Extinct; dispersed between numerous families and free cities
Zeeland	County	Burg	n/a	1012: Given to Flanders; 1167: West Zeeland in condomonium between Flanders and Holland; 1256: West Zeeland to Holland; 1303: West Zeeland to Hainaut; rest to Namur; 1323: All to Hainaut; 1432: To Burgundy; 1477: To the Burgundian Netherlands; 1556: To the Spanish Netherlands; 1581: Joined the Netherlands; 1648: Left the Empire as part of the Netherlands
Zell am Harmersbach	Imperial City	Swab	SW	1139: First mentioned; to Zähringen; 1218: To Swabia; 1256: To Hohengeroldseck and Strasbourg; 1333: To Baden; 14th Century: Free Imperial City; 1718: Harmersbach made Free Imperial Valley; 1803: To Baden
Ziegenhain	County	n/a	n/a	1148: First mentioned 1258: Partitioned into itself and Nidda; 1333: Acquired Nidda; 1450: Extinct; succession dispute between Hesse and Hohenlohe-Weikersheim. Ziegenhain was occupied by Hesse despite the legal succession of Hohenlohe; 1495: Confirmed to Hesse with compensation paid to Hohenlohe-Weikersheim
Zimmern	Lordship; 1538: County	Swab	SC	1080: First mentioned 1354: Acquired Meßkirch; 1415: Acquired Wildenstein; 1441: Partitioned into itself and Zimmern-Herrenzimmern; 1462: Acquired Oberndorf; 1488: To Werdenberg-Sigmaringen; 1503: Restored; 1508: Partitioned into Zimmern-Meßkirch and Zimmern-Wildenstein; 1575: Reunited by Zimmern-Meßkirch; 1594: Extinct; Oberndorf to Austria, Wald to Rottweil, rest to Helfenstein-Gundelfingen
Zimmern-Herrenzimmern	Lordship; 1538: County	Swab	SC	1445: Partitioned from Zimmern; 1512: To William Werner of Zimmern; 1538: HRE Count; 1575: Extinct; to Zimmern-Meßkirch
Zimmern-Meßkirch	Lordship; 1538: County	Swab	SC	1508: Partitioned from Zimmern; 1538: HRE Count; 1575: Renamed to Zimmern
Zimmern-Wildenstein	Lordship; 1538: County	Swab	SC	1508: Partitioned from Zimmern; originally at Oberndorf; 1514: Acquired sole rule of Wildenstein; 1538: HRE Count; 1554: Extinct; to Zimmern-Meßkirch
Zollern	Lordship; 1111: County	n/a	n/a	1061: First mentioned 1111: HRE Count c. 1144: Partitioned into itself and Hohenberg; 1192: Acquired Nuremberg; 1218: Partitioned into itself and Nuremberg; 1262: Acquired Schalksburg; 1288: Partitioned into Hohenzollern and Zollern-Schalksburg
Zollern-Schalksburg	County	n/a	n/a	1288: Partitioned from Zollern; 1403: Sold to Württemberg; 1408: Extinct
Zug	Imperial Valley	n/a	n/a	1264: All to Habsburg; 1352: Joined the Swiss Confederation; 1415: Free Imperial Valley; 1648: Left the Empire as part of Switzerland
Zürich	Imperial City	n/a	n/a	853: To Fraumünster Abbey; 1063: Under advocacy of Lenzburg; 1173: Under advocacy of Zähringen; 1218: Free Imperial City; 1351: Joined the Swiss Confederation; 1440: Expelled from the Swiss Confederacy; 1450: Re-admitted; 1648: Left the Empire as part of Switzerland
Zutphen	Lordship; 1101: County	Burg	n/a	1025: Mentioned; fief of Lower Lotharingia; 1046: Made fief of the Bishopric of Utrecht; 1101: HRE Count; 1118: Extinct in male line 1138: To Guelders; 1371: To Jülich-Guelders; 1423: To Guelders; 1538: To Jülich-Cleves-Berg; 1543: To the Spanish Netherlands; 1579: Joined the Netherlands; 1648: Left the Empire as part of the Netherlands
Zweibrücken	County	n/a	n/a	c. 1182: Partitioned from Saarbrücken; 1263: Side line Zweibrücken-Eberstein created 1286: Partitioned into Zweibrücken-Zweibrücken and Zweibrücken-Bitsch
Zweibrücken-Bitsch	County	n/a	n/a	1286: Partitioned from Zweibrücken; originally at Lemberg; 1297: Acquired Bitsch; 1485: Side line Zweibrücken-Bitsch-Ochsenstein established 1559: Acquired Ochsenstein; 1570: Extinct; to Hanau-Lichtenberg in succession dispute with Leiningen-Westerburg-Leiningen; 1572: To Lorraine; 1573: Leiningen claim sold to Lorraine; 1604: Lemberg given to Hanau-Lichtenberg
Zweibrücken-Bitsch-Ochsenstein	County	n/a	n/a	1485: Created when Henry I of Zweibrücken-Bitsch acquired Ochsenstein by marriage 1559: Extinct; to Zweibrücken-Bitsch
Zweibrücken-Eberstein	County	n/a	n/a	1263: Created when Simon I of Zweibrücken acquired half of Eberstein Elder Line; 1314: Extinct; to the Bishopric of Speyer
Zweibrücken-Zweibrücken	County	n/a	n/a	1286: Partitioned from Zweibrücken; 1385: Zweibrücken sold to the Palatinate; 1394: Extinct; remaining territory to Zweibrücken-Bitsch
Zwiefalten	Abbacy	Swab	SP	1089: Abbey established; to Achalm; 1098: To Urach; 1250: To Fürstenberg; 1265: To Württemberg; 1750: Imperial immediacy; joined the Swabian Prelates; 1802: To Württemberg; secularised and suppressed
