= Territories of the Holy Roman Empire outside the Imperial Circles =

A map of the Imperial Circles as in 1560. Unencircled territories appear in white.

When the Imperial Circles (Latin: Circuli imperii; German: Reichskreise) — comprising a regional grouping of territories of the Holy Roman Empire — were created as part of the Imperial Reform at the 1500 Diet of Augsburg, many Imperial territories remained unencircled.

Initially six circles were established in order to secure and enforce the Public Peace (Landfrieden) declared by Emperor Maximilian I and the jurisdiction of the Reichskammergericht. They did not incorporate the territories of the Prince-electors and the Austrian homelands of the ruling House of Habsburg. Only at the 1512 Diet of Trier were these estates (except for the Kingdom of Bohemia) included in the newly implemented Burgundian, Austrian, Upper Saxon, and Electoral Rhenish circles, confirmed by the 1521 Diet of Worms.

After 1512, the bulk of the remaining territories not comprised by Imperial Circles were the lands of the Bohemian crown, the Old Swiss Confederacy and the Italian territories (the exceptions were Savoy, Piedmont, Nice, and Aosta, which were part of the Upper Rhenish Circle). Besides these, there were also a considerable number of minor territories which retained imperial immediacy, such as individual Imperial Villages (Reichsdörfer), and the lands held by individual Imperial Knights (Reichsritter).

== List of unencircled territories ==
=== Lands of the Bohemian Crown ===
- the Kingdom of Bohemia (Bohemia proper)
- the Bohemian Margraviate of Moravia
- the Piast duchies of Silesia, in large part conquered by Prussia in 1742
  - in Lower Silesia:
    - the Duchy of Silesia-Wrocław, held by the Bohemian kings since 1335
    - the Duchy of Nysa, held by the Prince-Bishops of Wrocław
    - the Duchy of Legnica
    - the Duchy of Jawor, held by the Bohemian kings since 1392
    - the Duchy of Brzeg
    - the Duchy of Głogów
    - the Duchy of Żagań, held by the Saxon House of Wettin until 1549
    - the Duchy of Oleśnica
    - the Duchy of Bierutów
    - the Duchy of Ziębice
  - in Upper Silesia:
    - the Duchy of Opole
    - the Duchy of Racibórz
    - the Duchy of Cieszyn
    - the Duchy of Opava, established on Moravian territory in 1269
    - the Duchy of Krnov, partitioned from Opava in 1377
  - including the state countries of
    - Pszczyna
    - Syców
    - Żmigród
    - Milicz
    - Bytom Odrzański
    - Bytom
- the Margraviates of Upper (Bautzen) and Lower Lusatia (Lübben), ceded to Saxony in 1635, including the state countries of
  - Muskau
  - Seidenberg
  - Hoyerswerda
  - Königsbrück, from 1562
- the County of Kladsko, conquered by Prussia in 1742

=== Old Swiss Confederacy ===
The Old Swiss Confederacy remained part of the Holy Roman Empire until 1648, when it gained formal independence in the Peace of Westphalia.

- the Thirteen Cantons
  - the City of Zürich, since 1351
  - the City and Republic of Berne, since 1353; associate since 1323
  - the City of Lucerne, since 1332
  - Uri, founding canton (Federal Charter of 1291)
  - Schwyz, founding canton
  - Unterwalden (Obwalden and Nidwalden), founding canton
  - Zug, since 1352
  - Glarus, since 1352
  - the City of Fribourg, since 1481; associate since 1454
  - the City of Solothurn, since 1481; associate since 1353
  - the City of Basel, since 1501
  - the City of Schaffhausen, since 1501; associate since 1454
  - Appenzell, from 1513; associate since 1411
- Associates
  - the City of Biel/Bienne, since 1353
  - the County of Neuchâtel, since 1406
  - the Republic of Valais, since 1416/17
  - Abbey of Saint Gall, since 1451
  - the City of St. Gallen, since 1454
  - the Free State of the Three Leagues since 1497/99
  - the City of Mühlhausen (Mulhouse), from 1515
  - the City of Geneva, from 1519

=== Italy ===
- the Duchy of Mantua, held by the House of Gonzaga until 1708, when it passed to the Habsburgs
- the Duchy of Milan, held by the House of Sforza until 1535, and then by the Habsburgs
- the Duchy of Modena and Reggio, held by the House of Este
- the March of Montferrat, held by the House of Palaiologos, from 1533 by the House of Gonzaga
- the Republic of Florence, from 1532 the Duchy of Florence, from 1569 the Grand Duchy of Tuscany, held by the House of Medici until 1737, and then by the House of Lorraine
- the Republic of Lucca
- the Republic of Siena until 1555, when it was annexed by Florence
- Other small imperial fiefs, including the Marquisate of Saluzzo, the Duchy of Guastalla, the Duchy of Mirandola, the Duchy of Massa and Carrara, the Duchy of Sabbioneta, etc.

=== Other territories ===
- the territories of Imperial Knights
- the Imperial Villages
- minor territories, such as:
  - the County of Montbéliard
  - the Lordship of Schmalkalden (Schmalkalden)
  - the Lordship of Jever
  - the peasant republic of Dithmarschen (until incorporated into Holstein in 1559)

== See also ==
- Rittersturm
