= List of states in the Holy Roman Empire (G) =

This is a list of states in the Holy Roman Empire beginning with the letter G. Some historians mark the beginning of the Empire as 800, with the coronation of Frankish king Charlemagne ("Charles the Great").

== List ==
Name	Type	Imperial circle	Imperial diet	History
Gandersheim	Abbacy	Upp Sax	RP	856; 919: Imperial immediacy 1206: HRE Princess; 1802: To Brunswick-Wolfenbüttel; 1807: To Westphalia; 1815: To Brunswick
Gdańsk; See: Danzig	Imperial City			
Gelnhausen	Imperial Free City	Upp Rhen	RH	1170: Formed; 1803: Annexed to Hesse-Cassel; 1807: To Westphalia; 1813: To Hesse-Cassel
Gemen	Lordship	Low Rhen	WE	10th Century: Formed; To local Lords of Gemen; 1282: Gemen a fief of Cleves; 14th Century: Fief of Bishopric of Münster; 13??: Imperial immediacy 1492: Extinct; to Schaumburg and Holstein-Pinneberg; 1640: To Limburg-Styrum; 1644: To Limburg-Styrum-Gemen; 1782: To Limburg-Styrum-Illeraichen; 1800: To Bömelberg; 1806: To Salm-Kyrburg; 1810: To France; 1814: To Prussia
Gemert	HRE Lordship	n/a	n/a	12th Century: Formed; To local Lords of Gemert as fief of Brabant; 1220: Half to the Teutonic Order as fief of Brabant; 1331: Gemert half to 's-Hertogenbosch; 1366: All to Teutonic Order as fief of Brabant; 1478: Imperial immediacy 1648-1662: To the Netherlands; 1794: To France; 1795: To Batavian Republic
Geneva	County	n/a	n/a	9th Century: Formed; 1394: Extinct; to Thoire and Villars; 1401-5: Sold to Savoy
Geneva	Bishopric	n/a	n/a	5th Century: Formed; 1154: HRE Prince; 1526: Joined the Swiss Confederation as ally 1535: Secular power lost to the City; 1798: To France; 1815: To Switzerland
Gengenbach	Abbacy	Swab	SP	betw. 727–735; 9th Century: Imperial immediacy 1007: To Bishopric of Bamberg; 1139: Imperial immediacy 1751: Bench of Swabian Prelates; 1803: To Baden
Gengenbach	Imperial City	Swab	SW	c1250: Formed; 1360: Free Imperial City; 1803: To Baden
Gera	Advocacy (Vogtei)	n/a	n/a	1244: Partitioned from Plauen and Gera; 1314: Acquired Schleiz, Saalburg and Burgk; 1425: Partitioned into Gera-Burgk, Gera-Lobenstein and Gera-Schleiz
Gera-Burgk	Advocacy (Vogtei)	n/a	n/a	1425: Partitioned from Gera; 1426: Extinct; to Gera-Lobenstein
Gera-Gera	Advocacy (Vogtei)	n/a	n/a	1482: Partitioned from Gera-Lobenstein; 1502: Sold to Gera-Schleiz; 1508: Extinct
Gera-Lobenstein	Advocacy (Vogtei)	n/a	n/a	1425: Partitioned from Gera; 1482: Partitioned into Gera-Gera, Gera-Schleiz and itself 1489: Extinct; divided between Gera-Gera and Gera-Schleiz; 1509: Partitioned from Gera-Schleiz; 1538: Extinct; to Gera-Schleiz
Gera-Schleiz	Advocacy (Vogtei)	n/a	n/a	1425: Partitioned from Gera; 1448: Acquired Rochsburg; 1456: Extinct; to Gera-Lobenstein; 1482: Partitioned from Gera-Lobenstein; 1509: Partitioned into itself and Gera-Lobenstein; 1547: To Reuss-Plauen; 1550: Extinct
Gerlachsheim	Abbacy	n/a	n/a	1197: Formed; To Lords of Zimmern-Lauda as fief of Bishopric of Würzburg; To Wertheim as fief of Bishopric of Würzburg; 1319: Gerlachsheim Abbey fief of Bishopric of Würzburg; 1552: Formed; Direct possession of Bishopric of Würzburg; 1717: To Oberzell Abbey as fief of Bishopric of Würzburg; 1803: To Salm-Reifferscheid-Krautheim; 1806: To Baden
Geroldseck	Lordship	n/a	n/a	1080: First mentioned 1139: Established around Hohengeroldseck; 1186: Side line established at Ochsenstein; 1270: Acquired Veldenz; 1277: Partitioned into itself and Hohengeroldseck; 1279: Sold Diersburg to Schwarzenberg; 1300: Sold additional territory to Baden; 1426: Extinct; to Moers-Saarwerden in succession dispute with Hohengeroldseck; 1442: Half sold to Baden; 1522: Other half sold to Nassau-Saarbrücken; 1629: All to Nassau-Saarbrücken; 1803: To Baden
Geroldseck-Sulz	Lordship	n/a	n/a	1333: Partitioned from Hohengeroldseck; 1451: Extinct; 1473: Sold to Württemberg
Geyer von Giebelstadt	1685: HRE County	Franc	FR	1685: HRE Count; 1693: Bench of Counts of Franconia; 1708: Extinct
Giech; HRE Count & Lord of Giech	Lordship; 1680: HRE Barony; 1695: HRE County	Franc	FR	12th Century: Formed; 1680: HRE Baron; 1695: HRE Count; 1726: Bench of Counts of Franconia; 1791: Under overlordship of Prussia
Giengen	Imperial City	Swab	SW	11th Century: Formed; 1391: Free Imperial City; 1803: To Württemberg
Gimborn; Gimborn and Neustadt	Lordship; 1631: Imperial Lordship; 1783: County	Low Rhen	WE	? To Lords of Sankt Gereon as fief of Berg; 1273: To Lords of Sankt Gereon as fief of Mark; 1550: To Barons of Schwarzenberg (Franconian line) as fief of Mark; 1610: To Barons of Schwarzenberg (Franconian line) as fief of Brandenburg; 1631: Imperial immediacy 1682: Lower Rhenish-Westphalian Circle; 1702: Bench of Counts of Westphalia; 1782: To Wallmoden-Gimborn; 1783: HRE Count; 1806: To Berg; 1815: To Prussia
Glarus	Imperial valley	n/a	n/a	1395: Formed; Until 1395: To Säckingen Abbey; 1352: Joined Swiss Confederation, though subject to Säckingen Abbey; 1395: Free Imperial Valley; member of Swiss Confederation; 1648: Left Empire as member of Swiss Confederation; 1798: To Linth Canton within Helvetic Confederation; 1803: Canton of Glarus within Switzerland
Gleichen	County	n/a	n/a	1162: Title "Count of Gleichen" used by Counts of Tonna; 1228: Partitioned from Tonna; 1343: Partitioned into Gleichen-Blankenhain and Gleichen-Tonna
Gleichen-Blankenhain	County	Upp Sax	WT	1343: Partitioned from Gleichen; 1378: Partitioned into Gleichen-Blankenhain Elder Line, Gleichen-Blankenhain Intermediate Line and Gleichen-Blankenhain Younger Line; 1456: Reunited by Younger Line; 1627: Extinct; to the Archbishopric of Mainz; 1631: To Hatzfeld; 1794: To Saxe-Weimar-Eisenach
Gleichen-Blankenhain Elder Line	County	n/a	n/a	1378: Partitioned from Gleichen-Blankenhain; 1456: Extinct; to Gleichen-Blankenhain Younger Line
Gleichen-Blankenhain Intermediate Line	County	n/a	n/a	1378: Partitioned from Gleichen-Blankenhain; 1385: Extinct; to Gleichen-Blankenhain Elder Line
Gleichen-Blankenhain Younger Line	County	n/a	n/a	1378: Partitioned from Gleichen-Blankenhain; 1415: Partitioned into Gleichen-Rembda and itself 1456: Renamed to Gleichen-Blankenhain
Gleichen-Rembda	County	Upp Sax	WT	1415: Partitioned from Gleichen-Blankenhain Younger Line; 1596: Extinct; to Gleichen-Blankenhain
Gleichen-Tonna	County	Upp Sax	WT	1343: Partitioned from Gleichen; 1631: Extinct; divided between Hohenlohe-Langenburg, Schwarzburg-Sondershausen and Schenk von Tautenburg
Gleichenstein	County	n/a	n/a	1228: Partitioned from Tonna; 1294: Sold to the Archbishopric of Mainz; 1297: Extinct; 1802: To Prussia; 1807: To Westphalia; 1813: To Prussia
Gmünd see: Schwäbisch Gmünd				
Godesberg	County			1276: Partitioned from Neuenahr; 1465: Partitioned into Alpheim and Bedburg
Goldineshundare	County			950: Partitioned from Cläven; 1067: Extinct
Goltstein	1694: HRE Count	n/a	n/a	1305: First mentioned in Moravia; 15th Century: Fief of Jülich; 1771: immediate Lords of Slenaken; 1794: To France
Gorizia (Görz)	County; 1365: HRE Princely County; 1754: Princely County of Gorizia and Gradisca	Aust	n/a	11th Century: Formed; 1031: To Counts of Eppenstein; 1090: To Counts of Lurn; 1258: Division into Gorz and Tyrol (extinct 1335); 1500: Extinct; to Austria; 1754: United to form Gorizia and Gradisca; 1809: To France; 1813: To Austria
Goslar	Imperial City	Low Sax	RH	922; 1290: Free Imperial City; 1803: To Prussia; 1806: To Westphalia; 1813: To Prussia
Gradisca	1647: County; 1754: Princel County of Gorizia and Gradisca	Aust	-	1511: Annexed to Austria; 1647: To Eggenberg; 1717: To Austria; 1747: United to form Gorizia and Gradisca
Graevenitz (Grävenitz)	Lordship; 1707: County	Franc	FR	1290: First mentioned; ministerialis in Mecklenburg; 1707: HRE Count; 1718: Acquired Welzheim; 1728: Joined the Franconian Counts; 1733: Welzheim to Württemberg; retained personalist vote in the Franconian Circle
Grandvillars	Barony	n/a	n/a	11th Century: Formed; Barons of Grandvillars were fiefs of Montbéliard and Pfirt; 1648: To France
Granges	Lordship			
Gravenegg				Acquired Eglingen
Grävenitz; See: Graevenitz	Lordship			
Grävenstein (Gravenstein or Gråsten)	Lordship			
Greifensee	Lordship	n/a	n/a	1300: Created on transfer from Rapperswil to Landenburg; 1369: Sold to Toggenburg; 1402: To Zürich; 1798: Abolished
Greiz and Reichenbach	Advocacy (Vogtei)	n/a	n/a	1209: Partitioned from Weida; 1240: Extinct; to Plauen and Gera
Groningen	Lordship	Burg	n/a	1498: Formed; Free Frisians; 1498: Invested on the Duchy of Saxony but was unable to gain control of the region 1514/15: To Guelders; 1536: To Spanish Netherlands; 1579: To the Netherlands
Grubenhagen see "Brunswick-Grubenhagen"	Principality			
Gruyères (Greyerz)	County	n/a	n/a	11th Century: Formed; 1246: Fief of Savoy; 1536: Imperial immediacy 1554: Bankrupt; divided between Fribourg and Bern
Guastalla	County; 1621: Duchy	n/a	n/a	1406: Created for Guido Torelli; 1539: To Gonzago-Guastalla; 1621: Duchy; 1746: To Austria; 1748: To Parma; 1808: To France; 1814: To Parma
Guelders	Duchy	Burg	n/a	1082/1096: Formed c1088: Landgraviate; 1096: County; 1339: Duchy; 1179: Inherited County of Zutphen by marriage 1247: Acquired the pawned Imperial city of Nijmegen; 1393: Inherited Duchy of Jülich; 1473: To the Duchy of Burgundy; 1492: To House of Egmond; 1543: To the Duchy of Burgundy; After 1581: divided between United Provinces (no more HRE) and Spanish Netherlands; 1672: French occupation 1713: Southern South Gelderland fell to Prussia; 1795: To France; 1806: To Kingdom of Holland; 1810: To France; 1815: To the Netherlands and Prussia
Gundelfingen	Lordship	Swab	SC	11th Century: Formed; 1008: 1st mention of Gundelfingen after 1251: Partitioned into Gundelfingen-Hellenstein, Gundelfingen-Hohengundelfingen and Gundelfingen-Niedergundelfingen; 1647-1768: To Furstenberg
Gundelfingen-Hellenstein	Lordship	n/a	n/a	after 1251: Partitioned from Gundelfingen; 1273: Extinct; to Burgau; 1280: To Austria; 1292: To Rechberg; 1351: To Helfenstein-Blaubeuren; 1448: To Württemberg-Stuttgart; 1450: To Bavaria-Landshut; 1503: To Württemberg; 1521: To Ulm; 1536: To Württemberg
Gurk	1072: Bishopric; Prince-Bishopric	Aust	n/a	1072: Formed; 1803: To Austria (annexed to Carinthia)
Gutenstein	Lordship	n/a	n/a	12th Century: Formed; Originally to the Lords of Gutenstein; 13th Century: To Austria; 1306: To Magenbuch as fief of Austria; 1455: To Zimmern; 1594: To Austria; 1609: To Burgau; 1618: To Austria; 1624: To Hohenzollern-Sigmaringen as fief of Austria; 1652: To Mohr as fief of Austria; 1655: To Castell as fief of Austria; 1735: To Castell directly 1806: To Württemberg; 1810: To Baden
Gutenzell	Abbacy	Swab	SP	1237: Formed; 1417: Imperial immediacy 1803: To Toerring-Jettenbach; 1806: To Württemberg
