= List of states in the Holy Roman Empire (Q) =

This is a list of states in the Holy Roman Empire beginning with the letter Q. Some historians mark the beginning of the Empire as 800, with the coronation of Frankish king Charlemagne ("Charles the Great").

Name	Type	Imperial circle	Imperial diet	History
Quadt	Lordship	n/a	n/a	1262: First mentioned 14th century: Partitioned into Quadt-Rode and Quadt-Eller
Quadt-Buschfeld	Lordship; 1620: Barony	n/a	n/a	1447: Eberhard of Quadt acquired Buschfeld; 1451: Buschfeld to John William; 1498: Acquired Wickrath; 1518: Partitioned into Quadt-Wickrath, Quadt-Alsbach and itself 1620: HRE Baron; 1757: Extinct; to Leyen-Hohengeroldseck
Quadt-Hüchtenbruck	Lordship	n/a	n/a	1716: Renamed from Quadt-Wickrath-Zoppenbroich after adoption as heir of Hüchtenbruck; 1796: To France; 1815: To Prussia
Quadt-Kreuzberg	Lordship	n/a	n/a	1659: Established when John Arnold acquired Kreuzberg; 1697: Extinct; to Cologne
Quadt-Landskron	Lordship; 15th Century: Barony	n/a	n/a	1441: Established when Lothar acquired 1/2 of Oberwinter, Landskron and Tomburg; 1622: Landskron sold to Eynenberg; 1765: Extinct
Quadt-Rode	Lordship	n/a	n/a	14th century: Partitioned from Quadt; 1441: Side line Quadt-Landskron founded 1447: Side line Quadt-Buschfeld founded 15th Century: Rode sold to Plettenberg
Quadt-Wickrath	Lordship	Low Rhen	WF	1518: Partitioned from Quadt-Buschfeld; 1566: Acquired Zoppenbroich; 1599: Partitioned into Quadt-Wickrath-Schwanenberg and Quadt-Wickrath-Zoppenbroich
Quadt-Wickrath-Schwanenberg; Count of Quadt in Wykradt and Isny	Lordship; 1664: Barony; 1752: County	Low Rhen	WF	1599: Partitioned from Quadt-Wickrath; 1664: HRE Baron; 1752: HRE Count; 1796: To France; 1803: Compensated with Isny and St George's Abbey; 1806: To Württemberg
Quadt-Wickrath-Zoppenbroich	Lordship	n/a	n/a	1599: Partitioned from Quadt-Wickrath; 1659: Side line Quadt-Kreuzberg founded 1716: Renamed to Quadt-Hüchtenbruck
Quedlinburg	Abbacy	Upp Sax	RP	936: Established with Imperial immediacy 966: HRE Princess of the Empire; 1802: To Prussia; 1807: To Westphalia; 1815: To Prussia
Querfurt	Lordship	n/a	n/a	c. 950: First mentioned c. 1036: Partitioned into itself and Seeburg; 1136: Acquired Burgraviate of Magdeburg; 1178: Partitioned into Querfurt-Magdeburg and Querfurt-Querfurt; 1418: Querfurt-Vitzenburg last extant line 1430: Beyernaumburg to Asseburg; 1464: Sold Vitzenburg to Silmenitz; 1496: Sold to the Archbishopric of Magdeburg; 1506: To Prussia
Querfurt-Beyernaumburg	Burgraviate	n/a	n/a	1326: Partitioned from Querfurt-Querfurt; 1384: Extinct; to Querfurt-Vitzenburg
Querfurt-Magdeburg	Burgraviate	n/a	n/a	1178: Partitioned from Querfurt; Burgrave of Magdeburg; 1270: Burgraviate of Magdeburg sold to Saxe-Wittenberg; 1278: Partitioned into Querfurt-Rosenburg and Maidburg-Hardegg
Querfurt-Mansfeld	Burgraviate	n/a	n/a	1229: Formed when Burchard IV inherited 1/2 of Mansfeld; 1246: Renamed to Mansfeld
Querfurt-Mühlheim-Tannroda	Burgraviate	n/a	n/a	1269: Partitioned from Querfurt-Querfurt; 1392: Acquired Tannroda; 1418: Extinct; to Vitzthum
Querfurt-Querfurt	Burgraviate	n/a	n/a	1178: Partitioned from Querfurt; 1229: Senior line Querfurt-Mansfeld formed 1269: Partitioned into Querfurt-Mühlheim-Tannroda and itself 1326: Partitioned into Querfurt-Beyernaumburg and Querfurt-Vitzenburg
Querfurt-Rosenburg	Burgraviate	n/a	n/a	1278: Partitioned from Querfurt-Magdeburg; 1306: Extinct; to Maidburg-Hardegg
Querfurt-Vitzenburg	Burgraviate	n/a	n/a	1326: Partitioned from Querfurt-Querfurt; 1418: Renamed to Querfurt
