= List of states in the Holy Roman Empire (U) =

This is a list of states in the Holy Roman Empire beginning with the letter U. Some historians mark the beginning of the Empire as 800, with the coronation of Frankish king Charlemagne ("Charles the Great").

Name	Type	Imperial circle	Imperial diet	History
Überlingen	Imperial City	Swab	SW	1268: Free Imperial City; 1803: To Baden
Ulm	Imperial City	Swab	SW	1115: Free Imperial City; 1802: To Bavaria; 1810: To Württemberg
Umpfenbach	Territory	n/a	n/a	n/a 1773: Purchased by Philipp Freiherr von Gudenus and Valentin Ferdinand Freiherr von Gudenus from Christian Friedrich Carl Graf zu Castell-Remlingen; June 1, 1805: Purchased by Ferdinand von Trauttmansdorff from Ferdinand Freiherr von Gudenus
Unterwalden	Imperial Valley	n/a	n/a	Divided into Nidwalden and Obwalden from an early date 1173: To Counts of Habsburg; 1291: Became a founding member of the Swiss League; 1324: Imperial immediacy By 1350: Permanent division into Obwalden and Nidwalden; 1648: Left Empire as member of Swiss Confederation
Upper Alsace (Sundgau; Oberelsaß)	Landgraviate	n/a	n/a	1130: To Habsburg; 1469: Sold to Burgundy; 1477: To the Burgundian Netherlands; 1516: To Austria; 1648: To France
Upper Bavaria (Oberbayern)	Duchy	n/a	n/a	1255: Partitioned from Bavaria; 1314: Partitioned into the Palatinate and itself 1340: Renamed to Bavaria; 1349: Partitioned from Bavaria; 1363: Extinct; to Bavaria-Landshut
Upper Salm; See: Salm in the Vosges	County			
Urach	County	n/a	n/a	1040: First mentioned; brother of Achalm c. 1080: First use of title Count of Urach; 1098: Acquired Achalm; 1218: Acquired Freiburg; 1250: Partitioned into Freiburg, itself and Fürstenberg; 1261: Extinct; to Fürstenberg; 1265: Sold to Württemberg
Uri	Imperial Valley	n/a	n/a	853: To Fraumünster Abbey as part of Swabia; 12th Century: To Zähringen; 1218: To Habsburg; 1231: Free Imperial Valley; 1291: Became a founding member of the Swiss League; 1648: Left Empire as member of Swiss Confederation
Ursberg	Abbacy	Swab	SP	1126-8: Founded; 1143: Imperial immediacy 1803: To Bavaria
Ursin von Rosenberg; See: Orsini-Rosenberg	Principality			
Utrecht	Bishopric	Low Rhen	n/a	695: Diocese established 1024: HRE Prince of the Empire; 1528: Secularised as the Lordship of Utrecht; to the Spanish Netherlands
Utrecht	Lordship	Burg	n/a	1528: Bishopric of Utrecht secularised; to the Spanish Netherlands; 1548: Transferred to the Burgundian Circle; 1579: Dutch Revolt against Spain; 1648: Left the Empire as part of the Netherlands
Uznach	Lordship; 1209: County	n/a	n/a	12th Century: To Rapperswil; 1195: To Toggenburg; 1209: HRE Count; 1436: To Raron; disputed by Zürich; 1469: Sold to Schwyz and Glarus in condominium 1648: Left the Empire as part of Switzerland
