= List of states in the Holy Roman Empire (V) =

This is a list of states in the Holy Roman Empire beginning with the letter V. Some historians mark the beginning of the Empire as 800, with the coronation of Frankish king Charlemagne ("Charles the Great").

Name	Type	Imperial circle	Imperial diet	History
Vaduz	County	n/a	n/a	Originally to Werdenberg-Sargans; 1342: To Werdenberg-Sargans-Vaduz; 1396: Imperial immediacy in Swabia; 1416: To Brandis; 1510: Sold to Sulz; 1572: To Sulz-Vaduz; 1613: Sold to Hohenems; 1646: To Hohenems-Vaduz; 1678: Imperial abrogation (later in 1712: Sold to Liechtenstein→see)
Valais (Wallis)	County	n/a	n/a	999: To the Bishopric of Sion; 1648: Left the Empire as an ally of Switzerland
Varel	Lordship	n/a	n/a	1123: First mentioned; part of East Frisia; 15th Century: To Oldenburg; 1667: To Aldenburg; 1733: To Bentinck; 1811: To France; 1813: To Oldenburg
Vaud (Waadt)	County	n/a	n/a	Originally part of the Kingdom of Arles; 1032: To Zähringen; 1218: To Savoy; 1536: To Bern; 1648: Left the Empire as part of Switzerland
Vechta	County	n/a	n/a	1226: Partitioned from Ravensberg; 1244: Extinct; to Ravensberg; 1252: Sold to Münster; 1803: To Oldenburg; 1810: To France; 1814: To Oldenburg
Veldenz	County	n/a	n/a	By 1113: Partitioned from the Wildgraviate; 1270: Extinct; to Geroldseck by marriage 1277: To Hohengeroldseck; 1298: Partitioned from Hohengeroldseck; 1387: Partitioned into Veldenz-Lichtenberg and Veldenz-Moschellandsburg; 1389: Reunited by Veldenz-Moschellandsburg; 1444: Extinct; to Palatinate-Simmern and Zweibrücken by marriage 1459: To Palatinate-Zweibrücken; 1543: To Palatinate-Veldenz
Veldenz-Lichtenberg	County	n/a	n/a	1387: Partitioned from Veldenz; 1389: Extinct; to Veldenz-Moschellandsburg
Veldenz-Moschellandsburg	County	n/a	n/a	1387: Partitioned from Veldenz; 1389: Renamed to Veldenz
Velen (Vehlen)	Lordship; 1641: County	n/a	n/a	1221: First mentioned 13th Century: Extinct; to Berensfelde; 1313: Renamed from Berensfelde; 1555: Acquired Rheine-Bevergern; 1630: Acquired Papenburg; 1641: HRE Count; 1756: Extinct in male line; to Landsberg-Velen by marriage
Verden	Bishopric	Low Rhen	EC	c. 800: Diocese established 1180: Imperial immediacy; HRE Prince of the Empire; 1648: Secularised as Principality for Sweden
Verden	Principality	Low Rhen	PR	1648: Prince-Bishopric of Verden secularised for Sweden; 1712: To Denmark; 1715: Sold to Hanover; 1807: To Westphalia; 1810: To France; 1813: To Hanover
Verden	Imperial City	Low Rhen	RH	15th Century: Free Imperial City; 1648: To Sweden; united with the Principality of Verden
Verdun	Bishopric	Upp Rhen	EC	4th Century: Diocese established 997: Acquired county surrounding Verdun; 1552: To France; 1648: Annexation to France formally recognised
Verdun	Imperial City	Upp Rhen	RH	1374: Free Imperial City; 1552: To France; 1648: Annexation to France formally recognised
Vianden	County	n/a	n/a	1090: First mentioned; fief of Brabant; 1163: Acquired Salm in the Ardennes; 1175: Partitioned into itself and Salm in the Ardennes; 1264: Made fief of Luxembourg; partitioned into itself and Schönecken; 1400: Extinct; to Sponheim-Kreuznach; 1417: To Nassau-Dillenburg
Virneburg	HRE County	Low Rhen	WE	11th Century: First mentioned 1419: Acquired Neuenahr and Saffenburg; 1545: Extinct; to Manderscheid-Schleiden; 1554: Made fief of Trier; 1560: To Manderscheid-Schleiden-Virneburg as fief of Trier; 1590: To Manderscheid-Gerolstein by marriage as fief of Trier; 1639: To Löwenstein-Wertheim-Virneburg as fief of Trier; 1794: To France; 1815: To Prussia
Vogtland	Margraviate	Upp Sax	WT	Name given to territories of Weida, Reuss and Plauen; 1563: To Saxony
