= List of states in the Holy Roman Empire (T) =

This is a list of states in the Holy Roman Empire beginning with the letter T. Some historians mark the beginning of the Empire as 800, with the coronation of Frankish king Charlemagne ("Charles the Great").

Name	Type	Imperial circle	Imperial diet	History
Tanne	Lordship	n/a	n/a	1162: First mentioned 1210: Inherited and renamed to Waldburg
Tarasp (Trasp)	Barony	Aust	PR	1040: First mentioned 1160: Part to Chur; 1177: Extinct; to Chur bef. 1200: Sold to Reichenberg; 1239: Sold to the Tyrol; 1273: To Matsch as fief of the Tyrol; 1464: Sold to Austria; 1687: To Dietrichstein; 1684: Acquired Tarasp; 1802: Count Leslie of Balquhain; 1803: Tarasp to Switzerland; compensated with Neuravensburg; 1806: Neuravensburg to Württemberg
Teck	Duchy	n/a	n/a	1152: Partitioned from Zähringen c. 1215: Sold territory in Ortenau and Breisgau to Swabia; 1283: Partitioned into Teck-Owen and Teck-Oberndorf; 1363: Reunited by Teck-Owen; 1365: Acquired Mindelheim; 1374: Horb and Oberndorf sold to Hohenberg-Rottenburg; 1381: Teck sold to Württemberg; 1439: Extinct; to Rechberg-Babenhausen
Teck-Oberndorf	Duchy	n/a	n/a	1283: Partitioned from Teck; 1363: Extinct; to Teck-Owen
Teck-Owen	Duchy	n/a	n/a	1283: Partitioned from Teck; 1363: Renamed to Teck
Tecklenburg	County	Low Rhen	WE	c. 1100: First mentioned 1189: Acquired Ibbenbüren; 1262: Extinct; to Bentheim; 1279: Partitioned from Bentheim; 1328: Extinct; to Schwerin-Wittenburg; 1356: Partitioned from Schwerin-Wittenburg; 1365: Acquired Rheda; 1385: Acquired Iburg; 1400: Lost Cloppenburg, Friesoythe and Bevergern to Münster; 1493: Partitioned into itself and Tecklenburg-Lingen; 1557: Extinct; to Bentheim-Steinfurt; 1606: To Bentheim-Tecklenburg-Rheda; 1696: To Solms-Braunfels; 1707: Sold to Prussia; 1808: To Berg; 1811: To France; 1813: To Prussia
Tecklenburg-Lingen	County	Low Rhen	WE	1493: Partitioned from Tecklenburg; 1541: Extinct; to Tecklenburg; 1547: To Egmond
Tengen aka: Auersperg	Lordship; 1664: County	-	-	13th Century: Partitioned into Tengen-Hinterburg and Tengen-Vorderstadt; 1275: Renamed from Tengen-Vorderstadt; 1422: Acquired Nellenburg; 1465: Sold Nellenburg to Austria; 1522: Sold to Austria; 1651: To Rost; 1663: To Auersperg; 1664: HRE County; 1806: To Baden
Tengen-Hinterburg	Lordship	n/a	n/a	13th Century: Partitioned from Tengen; 1275: Sold to Klingenberg; 1305: Sold to Austria; 1387: To Klingenberg; 1462: To Bodman and Jungingen; 1488: To Mainau Commandry of the Teutonic Order; 1805: To Baden
Tengen-Vorderstadt	Lordship	n/a	n/a	13th Century: Partitioned from Tengen; 1275: Renamed to Tengen
Tettnang and Argen	County	Swab	SC	1780: Created from Montfort after purchase by Austria; 1805: To Bavaria; 1810: To Württemberg
Thannhausen	Lordship; 1665: HRE County	Swab	SC	1109: First mentioned; ministerialis of Hohenstaufen; 1268: Imperial immediacy 1360: To Margraviate of Burgau and Augsburg; 1560: To Baumgartner; 1665: Sold to Sinzendorf-Fridau-Neuburg; 1705: Sold to Stadion Alsatian Line; 1741: To Stadion-Thannhausen; 1806: To Bavaria
Thorn	Abbacy	Low Rhen	RP	992: Formed; 1292: Imperial immediacy 18th Century: HRE Princess of the Empire; 1794: To France; 1815: To the Netherlands
Thüngen	Lordship	n/a	n/a	1100: First mentioned 1406: Imperial immediacy 1806: To Würzburg; 1814: To Bavaria
Thurgau	Landgraviate	n/a	n/a	1218: To Kyburg; 1264: To Habsburg-Laufenburg; 1274: To Kyburg; 1379: To Austria; 1460: Made subject of the Swiss Confederation; 1648: Left the Empire as part of Switzerland
Thuringia	County Palatine	n/a	n/a	1291: Northern half of the County Palatine of Saxony sold to Brandenburg; the southern part retained by Meissen known henceforth as the County Palatine of Thuringia; 1350: Imperial confirmation of title
Thuringia	Princely Landgraviate	n/a	n/a	1131: Louis I appointed Landgrave of Thuringia; 1180: Acquired the County Palatine of Saxony; 1247: Extinct; divided between Hesse and Meissen
Thurn and Taxis (Thurn und Taxis)	1512: Lordship; 1608: Barony; 1624: Count; 1695: Principality	El Rhin	WE / PR	1512: Granted noble status in the Empire; 1608: HRE Baron; 1615: Appointed hereditary Imperial Postmaster General; 1624: HRE Count; 1681: Spanish Prince; 1695: HRE Prince; 1723: Acquired Eglingen; 1754: Bench of Secular Princes; 1785: Acquired Scheer and Friedberg; 1803: Acquired Buchau, Marchtal, Neresheim and Ostrach; 1806: To Bavaria, Hohenzollern-Sigmaringen and Württemberg
Thurnau	Lordship	n/a	n/a	1205: Förtsch von Thurnau first mentioned; ministerialis of Andechs-Meran; 1248: Imperial immediacy 1288: Half sold to Bamberg; 1292: Other half made fief of Bamberg; 1564: Extinct; to condominium of Künsberg and Giech as fief of Bamberg; 1699: Imperial immediacy 1731: Künsberg share sold to Giech; 1796: To Prussia; 1807: To France; 1810: To Bavaria
Toggenburg	Barony; 1209: County	n/a	n/a	1044: First mentioned 1209: HRE County; 1226: Lost Wil and Alt-Toggenburg to St Gall's Abbey; 1333: Acquired Vaz; 1384: Acquired Kyburg; 1394: Partitioned into Toggenburg Elder Line and Toggenburg Younger Line; 1468: Sold to Abbacy of St Gall
Toggenburg Elder Line	County	n/a	n/a	1394: Partitioned from Toggenburg; 1400: Extinct; succession dispute between Toggenburg Younger Line and William, Count of Montfort; 1436: Most to Toggenburg Younger Line; parts to Montfort-Toggenburg
Toggenburg Younger Line	County	n/a	n/a	1394: Partitioned from Toggenburg; 1414: Acquired Wartau; 1417: Acquired Feldkirch; 1424: Acquired Rheintal, Rheineck, Dornbirn and the Inner Bregenzerwald; 1436: Extinct in male line 1437: Divided between numerous states
Toul	Bishopric	Upp Rhen	EC	365: Formed; 1048: Imperial immediacy 1552: To France; 1648: Annexation to France formally recognised
Toul	Imperial City	Upp Rhen	RH	13th Century? Free Imperial City; 1552: To France; 1648: Annexation to France formally recognised
Trauttmansdorff; Prince of Trauttmansdorff-Weinberg and Neustadt am Kocher, Princely Count of Umpfenbach, Baron of Gleichenberg, Nogau, Burgau and Totzenbach, etc.	Lordship; 1598: Barony; 1623: County; 1805: Principality	Swab	SW	1308: First mentioned 1598: HRE Baron; 1623: HRE Count; 1631: Personalist in the Swabian Circle; 1635: Acquired Weinsberg; 1648: Returned Weinsberg to Württemberg; 1778: Personalist in the Bench of Swabian Counts; 1805: HRE Prince
Trent (Trento / Trient)	Bishopric	Aust	EC	301: First mentioned 1004: Acquired territory 1027: HRE Prince of the Empire; 1419: Subject of the Emperor c. 1519: Acquired Castelbarco and Rovereto; 1578: Imperial immediacy 1803: To Austria as part of Tyrol; 1805: To Bavaria; 1810: To Italy; 1813: To Austria; 1918: To Italy
Trieste	Imperial City	Aust	n/a	1285: Free Imperial City; 1382: To Austria; 1809: To France; 1813: To Austria
Trier (Treves)	Bishopric c. 811: Archbishopric; 1356: Electorate	El Rhin	EL	c. 250: First mentioned 771: Autonomous c. 811: Raised to Archdiocese; 898: Imperial immediacy 1356: HRE Prince-Elector; 1795: Left-bank territory to France; 1803: Right-bank territory to Nassau-Weilburg
Tübingen	County; 1146: County Palatine	n/a	n/a	1078: First mentioned, in the Nagoldgau; 1146: HRE Count Palatine; 1180: Partitioned into itself and Montfort c. 1219: Partitioned into Tübingen-Tübingen and Tübingen-Asperg
Tübingen-Asperg	County Palatine	n/a	n/a	c. 1219: Partitioned from Tübingen; 1229: Acquired Giessen; 1252: Partitioned into Tübingen-Böblingen and itself 1264: Sold Giessen to Hesse; 1308: Sold Asperg to Württemberg; 1340: Sold Beilstein to Württemberg; 1357: Extinct
Tübingen-Böblingen	County Palatine	n/a	n/a	1252: Partitioned from Tübingen-Asperg; 1294: Acquired Tübingen; 1342: Sold Tübingen to Württemberg; 1357: Sold Böblingen to Württemberg; renamed to Tübingen-Lichteneck
Tübingen-Herrenberg	County Palatine	n/a	n/a	c. 1251: Partitioned from Tübingen-Tübingen; 1289: Sold Laichingen to Bebenhausen Abbey; 1294: Sold Tübingen to Tübingen-Böblingen; 1382: Sold to Württemberg; 1391: Extinct
Tübingen-Horb	County Palatine	n/a	n/a	c. 1251: Partitioned from Tübingen-Tübingen; 1294: Extinct in male line 1306: To Hohenberg-Nagold by marriage
Tübingen-Lichteneck	County Palatine ?: County	n/a	n/a	c. 1357: Renamed from Tübingen-Böblingen ?: HRE Count; 1634: Extinct in male line 1664: Sold to Austria; 1666: Extinct
Tübingen-Tübingen	County Palatine	n/a	n/a	c. 1219: Partitioned from Tübingen c. 1251: Partitioned into Tübingen-Horb and Tübingen-Herrenberg
Turckheim (Turkheim)	Imperial City	Upp Rhen	RC	1312: Free Imperial City; 1648: To France
Tyrol (Tirol)	County	Aust	n/a	10th century? 1140? 1363: To Austria; 1493: Princely County; 1805: To Bavaria; 1814: To Austria; 1918: Southern Part to Italy
