= List of states in the Holy Roman Empire (D) =

This is a list of states in the Holy Roman Empire beginning with the letter D. Some historians mark the beginning of the Empire as 800, with the coronation of Frankish king Charlemagne ("Charles the Great").

Name	Type	Imperial circle	Imperial diet	History
Dagstuhl (Dachstuhl)	Lordship	Upp Rhen	n/a	802: To the Archbishopric of Trier; 1270: To Dagstuhl as fief of Trier; 1375: Extinct; to Fleckenstein, Kriechingen, Rollingen and Brücken; 1616-25: Acquired by Sötern piecemeal 1662: To Oettingen-Baldern; 1793: To France; 1815: To Prussia
Dannenberg	County	n/a	n/a	1153: First mentioned; branch of Salzwedel; 1303: Sold to Lüneburg; 1311: Extinct
Danzig (Gdańsk)	Imperial City	n/a	n/a	1263: Acquired autonomy 1301: To Denmark; 1308: To the Teutonic Order; 1457: To Poland with high autonomy 1793: To Prussia; 1807: Free City of Danzig; 1813: To Prussia
Daun	Lordship	n/a	n/a	1075: First mentioned 1163: Extinct; former servant Richard assumed the name and rights 1250: Acquired part of Oberstein; renamed to Daun-Oberstein
Daun-Falkenstein	County	Low Rhen	WE	1518: Renamed from Daun-Oberstein; 1546: Partitioned into Daun-Falkenstein and Daun-Oberstein; 1667: Sold Falkenstein to Lorraine; 1682: Extinct; to Leiningen-Heidesheim
Daun-Oberstein	Lordship; 1518: County	Low Rhen	WE	1250: Renamed from Daun; 1163: Extinct; former servant Richard assumed the name and rights 1250: Acquired part of Oberstein; renamed to Daun-Oberstein; 1518: Acquired Falkenstein; HRE Count; Renamed to Daun-Falkenstein; 1546: Partitioned from Daun-Falkenstein; 1636: Extinct; to Daun-Falkenstein; 1682: To Leiningen-Heidesheim; 1766: To Limburg-Styrum-Styrum; 1771: Idarbann to Baden; 1794: To France; 1815: To Prussia; 1817: Attached to the Principality of Birkenfeld
Dauphiné	County	n/a	n/a	1016: Albon first mentioned 1030: Acquired half of Viennois; By 1293: Became known as the Dauphiné of Viennois; 1349: Sold to France; 1355: Extinct
Degenberg	Lordship; 1465: Barony	Bav	SC	1189: First mentioned 1303: Acquired Weißenstein; 1438: Partitioned into Degenberg-Degenberg and Degenberg-Weißenstein; 1454: Reunited by Degenberg-Degenberg; 1465: HRE Baron; 1487: Imperial immediacy 1511: Acquired Hals; 1602: Extinct; succession disputed 1607: To Bavaria; Seat in Imperial Diet and Bavarian Circle revoked
Degenberg-Degenberg	Lordship	n/a	n/a	1438: Partitioned from Degenberg; 1454: Renamed to Degenberg
Degenberg-Weißenstein	Lordship	n/a	n/a	1438: Partitioned from Degenberg; 1454: Extinct; to Degenberg-Degenberg
Delmenhorst	County	Low Rhen	WE	1254: First mentioned; to Oldenburg; 1281: To Oldenburg-Delmenhorst; 1414: To Archbishopric of Bremen; 1438: To Oldenburg; 1463: To Oldenburg-Delmenhorst; 1464: To Oldenburg; 1482: To Bishopric of Münster; 1547: To Oldenburg; 1577: To Oldenburg-Delmenhorst; 1647: To Oldenburg; 1667: To Denmark; 1711: To Hanover; 1731: To Denmark; 1773: To Oldenburg
Dhaun	Wildgraviate	n/a	n/a	1258: Partitioned from the Wildgraviate; 1350: Extinct; to Stein
Diepholz	Barony; 1524: County	Low Rhen	WE	1160: First mentioned; fief of Saxony; 1285: Acquired Blankena; 1291: Imperial immediacy 1441: Acquired Wagenfeld, Bokel and Struten; 1482: Claimed title of Count; 1510: Partially made fief of Brunswick-Lüneburg; 1521: Remaining territory made fief of Hesse; 1553: Claimed Bronkhorst; 1585: Extinct; to Brunswick-Lüneburg and Hesse-Cassel
Diessen (Dießen)	County	n/a	n/a	954: First mentioned; Gau Counts in Traungau c. 1030: Partitioned into Wolfratshausen and itself Advocate (Vogt) of Bishopric of Brixen c. 1130: Acquired Plassenburg; 1132: Renamed to Andechs
Diessen (Dießen)	Abbacy	n/a	n/a	by 1130: Abbey established by Diessen on site of previously destroyed abbey 1132: To Andechs; 1248: Made fief of Bavaria; 1803: Abbey secularised and suppressed
Diessenhofen	Imperial City	n/a	n/a	1178: Made town of Kyburg; 1264: To Habsburg; 1415: Free Imperial City; 1442: To Austria; 1460: To the Old Swiss Confederacy as part of Thurgau
Diez (Dietz)	County	n/a	n/a	11th century: Formed in the Niederlahngau from Conradine properties 12th century: Inherited territories in the Wetterau from Nürings; 1208: Partitioned into Diez-Diez and Diez-Weilnau; 1223: Reunited by Diez-Weilnau; 1234: Partitioned into Diez-Diez, Diez-Birstein and Diez-Weilnau; 1522: Divided between Eppstein-Königstein and Hesse-Kassel (or Hesse-Cassel)
Diez-Birstein	County	n/a	n/a	1234: Partitioned from Diez; 1322: Extinct; to Diez-Weilnau; 1332: Half to Isenburg-Cleberg; 1340: Isenburg half to Isenburg-Büdingen; 1438: All to Isenburg-Büdingen
Diez-Diez	County	n/a	n/a	1208: Partitioned from Diez; 1223: Extinct; to Diez-Weilnau; 1234: Partitioned from Diez; 1388: Extinct; to Nassau-Dillenburg
Diez-Weilnau	County	n/a	n/a	1208: Partitioned from Diez; 1223: Renamed to Diez; 1234: Partitioned from Diez; 1454: Extinct; to Nassau-Dillenburg
Dinkelsbühl	Imperial City	Swab	SW	1351: Free Imperial City; 1802: To Bavaria
Disentis	Abbacy	Swab	SP	8th Century: Abbey established 9th Century?: Imperial immediacy 11th Century: HRE Prince of the Empire; 1395: Co-founded the Grey League; 1648: Left the Empire as an ally of Switzerland
Donauwörth; See: Schwäbisch Wörth	Imperial City			
Dornbirn	Lordship	n/a	n/a	9th century Originally to Bregenz; 1171: To Tübingen; 1180: To Montfort; 1258: To Montfort-Feldkirch; 1375: To Austria; 1575: Much to Hohenems; 1654: Rest sold to Hohenems; the townsfolk repurchased it for Austria; 1771: To Austria; 1805: To Bavaria; 1814: To Austria
Dortmund	Imperial City	Low Rhen	RH	1220: Free Imperial City; 1803: To Nassau-Orange-Fulda; 1806: To Berg; 1813: To Prussia
Drau (Pettau, Lower Carantanian March)	Margraviate	n/a	n/a	Around 970-980; 1147: Inherited by the Styrian Otakars; 1254: To Hungary; 1260: To Bohemia; 1278: To Austria; By 1482: Integrated into the Duchy of Styria
Drenthe	County	Burg	n/a	8th century: Originally a gau county 1024: To Bishopric of Utrecht; 1528: To the Spanish Netherlands; 1581: To United Provinces; 1648: Left the Empire as part of the Netherlands
Duisburg	Imperial City	n/a	n/a	10th century?: Free Imperial City; 1290: Annexed to Cleves; 1314: To Berg; 1392: To Cleves
Düren	Imperial City	n/a	n/a	1000: Free Imperial City; 1241: To Jülich
Dyck	Lordship	n/a	n/a	10th century 1394: Extinct; to Reifferscheid-Bedburg; 1460: To Salm-Reifferscheid; 1639: To Salm-Reifferscheid-Dyck; 1794: To France; 1815: To Prussia
