= List of states in the Holy Roman Empire (J) =

This is a list of states in the Holy Roman Empire beginning with the letter J. Some historians mark the beginning of the Empire as 800, with the coronation of Frankish king Charlemagne ("Charles the Great").

Name	Type	Imperial circle	Imperial diet	History
Jagdberg	Lordship			
Jauer (Jawor)	Duchy	n/a	n/a	1277: Partitioned from Liegnitz; 1281: Partitioned into itself and Löwenberg; 1308: Partitioned into Schweidnitz and itself 1346: Extinct; to Schweidnitz
Jever	1330: Chiefdom; Barony			1353: Formed; 1575: Annexed to Oldenburg; 1667: Annexed to Anhalt-Zerbst; 1793: Annexed to Russia; 1806: French occupation 1807: Ceded by Russia to France; 1807: To Kingdom of Holland; 1810: To France; 1814: Russian occupation 1814: Oldenburg administration 1818: Ceded to Oldenburg
Jülich	Duchy	Low Rhen	n/a	1000s: County; 1143: From the Jülichgau; 1336: Margraviate; 1356: Duchy; 1423: United with Berg; 1511: United from Cleves-Marck and Jülich-Berg as Jülich-Cleves-Berg; 1521: United with Berg, Cleves and Mark; 1582: HRE Council of Princes; 1609: War of Succession: divided between Brandenburg, Saxony and the Electorate of the Palatinate; 1614: Passed to Palatinate-Neuburg; 1742: To Dukes of Palatinate-Sulzbach then Bavaria; 1794: French occupation 1815: To Prussia
Justingen	Lordship	Swab	SC	1090: First mentioned 1343: Extinct; to Stöffeln; 1494: To Stotzingen; 1497: Sold to Bubenhofen; 1530: Sold to Freyberg-Öpfingen; 1751: Sold to Württemberg
