= List of states in the Holy Roman Empire (M) =

This is a list of states in the Holy Roman Empire beginning with the letter M. Some historians mark the beginning of the Empire as 800, with the coronation of Frankish king Charlemagne ("Charles the Great").

Name	Type	Imperial circle	Imperial diet	History
Magdeburg	Archbishopric	Low Sax	see Duchy	968: Formed; 1180: Imperial immediacy 1680: Secularised as Duchy for Brandenburg
Magdeburg	Burgraviate	n/a	n/a	c. 1000: Enfieffed to Walbeck; 1080: Enfeoffed to Herman of Spanheim; 1118: To Groitzsch; 1136: Enfeoffed to Querfurt; 1178: To Querfurt-Magdeburg; 1269: To Saxe-Wittenberg
Magdeburg	Duchy	Low Sax	PR	1680: Archbishopric of Magdeburg secularised as Duchy for Brandenburg; 1807: Dissolved; west to Westphalia, east to Prussia
Maidburg-Hardegg	Burgraviate	n/a	n/a	1278: Younger branch of Querfurt-Magdeburg assumed the name Maidburg-Hardegg after inheriting Hardegg; 1481: To Austria; 1484: Extinct
Mainau	Commandry of the Teutonic Order	Swab	n/a	724: To Reichenau Abbey; 1271: To the Teutonic Order; 1730: Acquired Dettingen, Dingelsdorf and Litzelstetten; 1783: Acquired Allmannsdorf; 1806: To Baden
Mainz	Archbishopric; 1356: HRE Prince-Elector	El Rhin	EL	4th Century: Formed; 780: Archbishopric; 1356: HRE Prince-Elector; 1803: To the Archbishopric of Regensburg
Mainz	Imperial City	n/a	n/a	1244: Free Imperial City; 1462: To the Archbishopric of Mainz
Malberg	Lordship	n/a	n/a	1273: Acquired by Reifferscheid; to the Elder Line; 1302: To Luxembourg
Manderscheid	Lordship; 1457: County	n/a	n/a	1133: First mentioned 1445: Acquired Schleiden; 1457: HRE Count; 1469: Acquired Blankenheim; 1488: Partitioned into Manderscheid-Schleiden, Manderscheid-Blankenheim-Gerolstein and Manderscheid-Kail
Manderscheid-Blankenheim	County	Low Rhen	WE	1530: Partitioned from Manderscheid-Blankenheim-Gerolstein; 1780: Extinct in male line; to Sternberg-Manderscheid by marriage
Manderscheid-Blankenheim-Gerolstein	County	Low Rhen	WE	1488: Partitioned from Manderscheid; 1530: Partitioned into Manderscheid-Gerolstein and Manderscheid-Blankenheim
Manderscheid-Gerolstein	County	Low Rhen	WE	1530: Partitioned from Manderscheid-Blankenheim-Gerolstein; 1697: Extinct; to Manderscheid-Blankenheim
Manderscheid-Kail	County	Low Rhen	WE	1488: Partitioned from Manderscheid; 1742: Extinct; to Manderscheid-Blankenheim
Manderscheid-Schleiden	County	Low Rhen	WE	1488: Partitioned from Manderscheid; 1545: Acquired Virneburg; 1560: Partitioned into Manderscheid-Schleiden-Kerpen and Manderscheid-Schleiden-Virneburg
Manderscheid-Schleiden-Kerpen	County	Low Rhen	WE	1560: Partitioned from Manderscheid-Schleiden; 1583: Under Imperial ban 1593: Extinct; divided between Manderscheid-Kail and Mark-Schleiden in succession dispute
Manderscheid-Schleiden-Virneburg	County	Low Rhen	WE	1560: Partitioned from Manderscheid-Schleiden; 1590: Extinct in male line; to Manderscheid-Gerolstein by marriage 1639: To Löwenstein-Wertheim-Virneburg by marriage
Mansfeld	County	n/a	n/a	c. 1050: First mentioned as a title of the gau counts in Hassegau; 1112: Count of Mansfeld primary title c. 1215: Partitioned into itself and Friedeberg; 1229: Extinct; to Querfurt-Mansfeld; 1246: Querfurt-Mansfeld assumed the name Mansfeld; 1266: Partitioned into itself and Schraplau; 1273: Partitioned into Mansfeld Elder Line and Mansfeld Younger Line
Mansfeld-Arnstein	County	Upp Sax	WT	1563: Partitioned from Mansfeld-Vorderort; 1580: Mediatised; 3/5 to Saxony, 2/5 to Magdeburg; 1615: Extinct; divided between Mansfeld-Artern, Mansfeld-Bornstedt, Mansfeld-Eisleben and Mansfeld-Friedeburg
Mansfeld-Artern	County	Upp Sax	WT	1563: Partitioned from Mansfeld-Vorderort; 1580: Mediatised; 3/5 to Saxony, 2/5 to Magdeburg; 1631: Extinct; divided between Mansfeld-Bornstedt and Mansfeld-Eisleben
Mansfeld-Bornstedt; HRE Prince and Prince of Fondi, Count and Lord of Mansfeld, Noble Lord of Heldrungen, Seeburg and Schraplau, Lord of the Lordship of Dobrzisch, Neuhaus and Arnstein	County	Upp Sax	WT	1563: Partitioned from Mansfeld-Vorderort; 1580: Mediatised; 3/5 to Saxony, 2/5 to Magdeburg; 1780: Extinct; Saxon portion to Saxony, Magdeburgian portion to Magdeburg. Mansfeld property in the Habsburg domain to Austria; 1789: Austrian fiefs to Colloredo-Mansfeld
Mansfeld-Eisleben	County	Upp Sax	WT	1563: Partitioned from Mansfeld-Vorderort; 1580: Mediatised; 3/5 to Saxony, 2/5 to Magdeburg; 1710: Extinct; to Mansfeld-Bornstedt
Mansfeld Elder Line	County	n/a	n/a	1273: Partitioned from Mansfeld; 1313: Extinct; to Mansfeld Younger Line
Mansfeld-Friedeburg	County; 1594: Principality	Upp Sax	WT	1563: Partitioned from Mansfeld-Vorderort; 1580: Mediatised; 3/5 to Saxony, 2/5 to Magdeburg; 1594: HRE Prince; 1626: Extinct; divided between Mansfeld-Artern, Mansfeld-Bornstedt and Mansfeld-Eisleben
Mansfeld-Heldrungen	County	Upp Sax	WT	1563: Partitioned from Mansfeld-Vorderort; 1572: Extinct; divided between Mansfeld-Arnstein, Mansfeld-Artern, Mansfeld-Bornstedt, Mansfeld-Eisleben and Mansfeld-Friedeburg
Mansfeld-Hinterort	County	Upp Sax	WT	1501: Partitioned from Mansfeld Line 1; 1547: Under Imperial Ban; 1552: Imperial Ban lifted 1560: Partitioned into Mansfeld-Hinterort Elder Line, Mansfeld-Hinterort Intermediate Line and Mansfeld-Hinterort Younger Line
Mansfeld-Hinterort Elder Line	County	Upp Sax	WT	1560: Partitioned from Mansfeld-Hinterort; 1666: Extinct; divided between Mansfeld-Bornstedt and Mansfeld-Eisleben
Mansfeld-Hinterort Intermediate Line	County	Upp Sax	WT	1560: Partitioned from Mansfeld-Hinterort; 1628: Extinct; to Mansfeld-Hinterort Elder Line
Mansfeld-Hinterort Younger Line	County	Upp Sax	WT	1560: Partitioned from Mansfeld-Hinterort; 1594: Extinct; divided between Mansfeld-Hinterort Elder Line and Mansfeld-Hinterort Intermediate Line
Mansfeld Line 1	County	n/a	n/a	1420: Partitioned from Mansfeld Younger Line; 1442: Acquired half of Friedeburg, and Salzmünde; 1482: Acquired Heldrungen; 1492: Extinct; to Mansfeld Line 2
Mansfeld Line 2	County	n/a	n/a	1420: Partitioned from Mansfeld Younger Line; 1449/52: Acquired Artern; 1501: Partitioned into Mansfeld-Vorderort, Mansfeld-Mittelort and Mansfeld-Hinterort
Mansfeld Line 3	County	n/a	n/a	1420: Partitioned from Mansfeld Younger Line; 1442: Acquired half of Friedeburg; 1499: Extinct; to Mansfeld Line 2
Mansfeld-Mittelort (Mansfeld-Schraplau)	County	Upp Sax	WT	1501: Partitioned from Mansfeld Line 1; 1602: Extinct; to the lines of Mansfeld-Hinterort
Mansfeld-Vorderort	County	Upp Sax	WT	1501: Partitioned from Mansfeld Line 1; 1563: Partitioned into Mansfeld-Bornstedt, Mansfeld-Eisleben, Mansfeld-Friedeburg, Mansfeld-Arnstein, Mansfeld-Artern and Mansfeld-Heldrungen; 1580: Mansfeld-Vorderort mediatised; 3/5 to Saxony, 2/5 to Magdeburg
Mansfeld Younger Line	County	n/a	n/a	1273: Partitioned from Mansfeld; 1420: Partitioned into Mansfeld Line 1, Mansfeld Line 2 and Mansfeld Line 3
Marchtal	Abbacy	Swab	SP	bef. 776: Formed; 1500: Imperial immediacy 1803: To Thurn and Taxis; 1806: To Württemberg
Mark (Marck)	1198: County	Low Rhen	PR	1226: Renamed from Altena-Berg; 1299: Acquired Arenberg; 1328: Partitioned into itself and Mark-Arenberg; 1391: To Cleves; 1394: To Cleves-Mark; 1521: To Jülich-Cleves-Berg; 1609: Extinct; War of Jülich Succession between Brandenburg and Palatinate-Neuburg; 1614: To Brandenburg; 1807: To France; 1808: To Berg; 1813: To Prussia
Mark-Arenberg (Marck-Arenberg)	County	Low Rhen	WE	1328: Partitioned from Mark; 1454: Partitioned into itself and Mark-Rochefort; 1547: To Ligne by marriage; who assumed the name Arenberg
Mark-Rochefort (Marck-Rochefort)	County	n/a	n/a	1454: Partitioned from Mark-Arenberg; 1544: Extinct; to Louis of Stolberg-Stolberg, founder of line Stolberg-Rochefort
Mark-Schleiden (Marck-Schleiden)	County	Low Rhen	WE	1593: Philip of Marck inherited part of Manderscheid-Schleiden-Kerpen, assumed the name Mark-Schleiden; 1774: Extinct; to Arenberg
Marmoutier (Maursmünster)	Abbacy	Upp Rhen	SP	by 659: Formed; 659: Imperial immediacy 1648: To France; 1789: Suppressed
Martinstein	Lordship	n/a	n/a	Formerly to Daun; 1340: To the Archbishopric of Mainz; 1353: Enfeoffed to Grasewege; 1389: Enfeoffed to Merxheim c. 1555: Enfeoffed to Hunoltstein and Sickingen; 1655: Sovereignty to Schönborn; 1660: Enfeoffed to Weyers-Leyen and Ebersberg; 1716: Sovereignty to Baden; 1771: Ebersberg fief to Baden; 1795: To France; 1815: To Prussia
Massa and Carrara (Malaspina)	Marquisate; 1568: Principality; 1662: Duchy of Massa and Principality of Carrara	n/a	n/a	1473: Formed when Massa acquired Carrara; 1568: HRE Prince; 1664: HRE Duke; 1796: To the Cispadane Republic; 1797: To the Cisalpine Republic; 1802: To Italy; 1815: Restored; 1829: To Modena and Reggio
Matsch	Barony	n/a	n/a	12th Century: Formed; 1278: Acquired Tarasp; 1344: Acquired Castels; 1348: Lost Chiavenna, Puschlav and Bormio to Milan; 1365?: Acquired Greifenstein; 1372: Sold Malans to Underwegen; 1394: Lost Greifenstein to the Bishopric of Chur; 1400: Acquired Steinsberg; 1421: Lost Advocacy of Marienberg and Müstair to the Tyrol; 1464: Sold Tarasp to the Tyrol; 1487: Under Imperial Ban; 1496: Sold Castels to Austria; 1504: Extinct; remaining territories to Trapp
Maulbronn	Abbacy	Swab	SP	1147: Established with imperial immediacy 1504: Made fief of Württemberg; 1534: Abbey suppressed 1548: Abbey restored as fief of Württemberg; 1807: Secularised and suppressed
Mechelen (Malines)	Lordship; 1490: County (title remained "Lord")	Burg	n/a	910: Fief of Bishop of Liège; 1333: To Flanders; 1369: To Burgundy; 1483: To the Burgundian Netherlands; 1516: To the Spanish Netherlands; 1713: To the Austrian Netherlands; 1795: To France; 1815: To the Netherlands; 1830: To Belgium
Mecklenburg	Principality; 1347: Duchy	n/a	n/a	1167: Obotrite prince became a vassal of Saxony, known then on in Germany as Mecklenburg; 1180: Imperial immediacy 1234: Partitioned into itself, Werle, Rostock and Parchim-Richenberg; 1255: Acquired Sternberg; 1301: Acquired Wismar; 1304: Acquired Stargard; 1312: Acquired Rostock; 1319: Acquired Prignitz and Uckermark; 1325: Lost Prignitz and Uckermark; 1347: HRE Duke; 1352: Partitioned into Mecklenburg-Schwerin and Mecklenburg-Stargard
Mecklenburg-Grabow	Duchy	n/a	n/a	c. 1669: Appanage created in Mecklenburg-Schwerin; 1747: Inherited Mecklenburg-Schwerin; appanage abolished
Mecklenburg-Güstrow	Duchy	Low Sax	PR	1480: Partitioned from Mecklenburg-Schwerin; 1483: Extinct; to Mecklenburg-Schwerin; 1520: Partitioned from Mecklenburg-Schwerin; 1610: Extinct; to Mecklenburg-Schwerin; 1621: Partitioned from Mecklenburg-Schwerin; 1628-31: To Wallenstein; 1695: Extinct in male line; succession dispute 1701: Ratzeburg and Stargard to Mecklenburg-Strelitz; rest to Mecklenburg-Schwerin
Mecklenburg-Mirow	Duchy	n/a	n/a	1658: Appanage created in Mecklenburg-Schwerin; 1675: Extinct; to Mecklenburg-Schwerin
Mecklenburg-Schwerin; Grand Duke of Mecklenburg, Prince of the Wendes, Schwerin & Ratzeburg, Count of Schwerin, Lord of the Lands of Rostock and Stargard	Duchy; 1815: Grand Duchy	Low Sax	PR	1352: Partitioned from Mecklenburg; 1358: Acquired Schwerin; 1480: Partitioned into itself and Mecklenburg-Güstrow; 1436: Acquired 1/3 of Werle; 1520: Partitioned into itself and Mecklenburg-Güstrow; 1552: Succession dispute 1556: Given to John Albert I, co-Duke of Mecklenburg-Güstrow; 1621: Partitioned into itself and Mecklenburg-Güstrow; 1628-31: To Wallenstein; 1648: Acquired the Bishopric of Schwerin; 1658: Appanage Mecklenburg-Mirow; 1669: Appanage Mecklenburg-Grabow created 1815: Grand Duchy
Mecklenburg-Stargard	Duchy	n/a	n/a	1352: Partitioned from Mecklenburg; 1408: Partitioned into Mecklenburg-Stargard-Sternberg and Mecklenburg-Stargard-Neubrandenburg; 1438: Reunited by Mecklenburg-Stargard-Neubrandenburg; 1471: Extinct; to Mecklenburg-Schwerin
Mecklenburg-Stargard-Neubrandenburg	Duchy	n/a	n/a	1408: Partitioned from Mecklenburg-Stargard; 1436: Acquired 1/3 of Werle; 1438: Renamed to Mecklenburg-Stargard
Mecklenburg-Stargard-Sternberg	Duchy	n/a	n/a	1408: Partitioned from Mecklenburg-Stargard; 1436: Acquired 1/3 of Werle; 1438: Extinct; to Mecklenburg-Stargard-Neubrandenburg
Mecklenburg-Strelitz; Grand Duke of Mecklenburg, Prince of the Wendes, Schwerin and Ratzeburg, Count of Schwerin, Lord of the Lands of Rostock and Stargard	Duchy; 1815: Grand Duchy	Low Sax	PR	1701: Created from Ratzeburg and Stargard from Mecklenburg-Güstrow for Adolphus Frederick II; 1815: Grand Duke
Megen	County	n/a	n/a	1145: First mentioned; fief of Lower Lotharingia; 1190: Imperial immediacy 1420: Extinct; to Dicbier; 1469: To Brimeu; 1610: To Croÿ; 1666: To Velen; 1697: To the Palatinate; 1728: To Schall von Bell; 1794: To France; 1800: To the Batavian Republic; 1806: To Holland; 1810: To France; 1815: To the Netherlands
Meissen	Bishopric	Upp Sax	EC	948: Formed; 1180: Imperial immediacy 13th Century: HRE Prince of the Empire; 1666: To Saxony
Meissen	Burgraviate	n/a	n/a	bef. 1006: First mentioned 1170: To Sterker von Wohlsbach; 1199: To Werben c. 1350: To Werben-Hartenstein; 1388: To Werben-Frauenstein; 1426: Acquired by Plauen-Plauen who adopted the style 1466: Lost Plauen, Pausa, Gefell, and Graßlitz to Saxony; 1572: Extinct; to Saxony
Meissen	Margraviate	n/a	n/a	965: Partitioned from the Marca Geronis; 982: Acquired Merseburg and Zeitz; 1002: Lost Lusatia; 1247: Acquired Thuringia and the County Palatine of Saxony; 1261: Partitioned into itself and Landsberg; 1423: Purchased Saxony; henceforth Elector of Saxony
Memmingen	Imperial City	Swab	SW	1286: Free Imperial City; 1802: To Bavaria
Mergentheim	Commandry of the Teutonic Order	Franc	EC	1058: First mentioned; property of Hohenlohe; 1219: To the Teutonic Order; 1527: Main seat of the Grandmaster of the Order; 1805: HRE Prince; 1809: To Württemberg
Merseburg	Bishopric	Upp Sax	EC	968: Formed; 1004: HRE Prince of the Empire; 1565: To Saxony; 1656: To Saxe-Merseburg; 1738: To Saxony; 1815: To Prussia
Merseburg	Burgraviate	n/a	n/a	c. 920: to Goseck; 1004: Title retained by Goseck but not the property
Merseburg	Margraviate	n/a	n/a	965: Partitioned from the Marca Geronis; 982: Extinct; to the Margraviate of Meissen
Meßkirch (Messkirch)	Lordship	Swab	SC	1080: First mentioned; to Rohrdorf c. 1210: To Frederick of Waldburg who founded the line Waldburg-Rohrdorf c. 1300: To Waldburg-Meßkirch; 1354: To Zimmern; 1508: To Zimmern-Meßkirch; 1594: To Helfenstein-Gundelfingen; 1627: To Fürstenberg-Messkirch; 1744: To Fürstenberg; 1806: To Baden
Metz	Bishopric	Upp Rhen	EC	by 535: Established; 945, 1047, 1152: Acquired Metzgau piecemeal 1065: Acquired Saarbrücken; 1123: Lost Saarbrücken; 1241: Lost Dagsburg; 1558: Most to France; 1632: All territory of the Bishopric to France; 1648: Annexation to France formally recognised
Metz	Imperial City	Upp Rhen	RH	1189: Free Imperial City; 1552: To France; 1648: Annexation to France formally recognised
Michaelsberg (Siegberg)	Abbacy	Low Rhen	RP	1064: Formed; 1512: Imperial immediacy 1676: To Palatinate-Neuburg; 1685: To the Palatinate; 1802: Suppressed
Mindelheim	Lordship; 1714: Principality of Mindelheim and Schwabegg	Swab	SC / PR	1250: First mentioned by 1370: To Teck; 1439: To Rechberg-Babenhausen; 1467: Sold to Frundsberg; 1591: Sold to Fugger-Kirchheim; 1598: To Fugger-Glött; 1616: To Bavaria; 1704: To Churchill-Marlborough; HRE Prince; 1714: To Bavaria
Minden	Bishopric	Low Rhen	see below	800: Formed; 1180: Imperial immediacy; HRE Prince; 1648: Secularised as a Principality for Brandenburg
Minden	Principality	Low Rhen	PR	1648: Secularised from the Bishopric of Minden for Brandenburg; 1807: To Westphalia; 1815: To Prussia
Moers (Mörs)	Lordship c. 1230: County; 1706: Principality	Low Rhen	WE	c. 1160: First mention of Lords of Moers; fief of the Archbishopric of Cologne c. 1230: HRE Count; 1288: Fief of Cleves; 1385: Acquired Friemersheim; 1399: Acquired Saarwerden by marriage 1417: Partitioned into itself and Moers-Saarwerden; 1488: Seized by the Emperor; 1493: To Wied-Runkel; 1500: Returned to Moers; 1501: Extinct; to Moers-Saarwerden; 1510: To Wied-Runkel; 1519: To Neuenahr-Bedburg; 1584: To Spain; 1597: To Neuenahr-Bedburg; 1600: To Cleves; 1601: To Maurice of Nassau-Orange; united with Nassau-Orange from 1618: Formed; 1607: Imperial immediacy 1702: To Prussia; 1794: To France; 1815: To Prussia
Moers-Saarwerden	County	Upp Rhen	WE	1417: Partitioned from Moers; 1527: Extinct; to Nassau-Saarbrücken
Mondsee	Abbacy	?	SP	748: Formed; 788: Imperial immediacy 831: To the Bishopric of Regensburg; 1142: Regained imperial immediacy 1506: Fief of Austria; 1791: Suppressed
Mons (Bergen)	County	n/a	n/a	980: Partitioned from Hainaut; 1071: Extinct; to Hainaut
Monschau (Montjoie)	Barony	n/a	n/a	1221: Mentioned as a property of Limburg; 1226: To Limburg-Monschau; 1262: To Valkenburg; 1354: To Schönau-Schönforst; 1433: To Jülich
Montbéliard (Mömpelgard)	County	Swab	PR	10th Century: First mentioned 1105: To Scarponnois; 1163: To Montfaucon who assumed the title Montbéliard; 1397: To Württemberg by marriage 1793: To France
Montechiarugolo	County			1180: Partitioned from Guastalla; 1612: Acquired by the Duchy of Parma
Montfort	County	n/a	n/a	1180: Partitioned from Tübingen; 1258: Partitioned into Montfort-Feldkirch, Montfort-Bregenz, Montfort-Tettnang, Werdenberg-Heiligenberg and Werdenberg-Sargans
Montfort-Bregenz	County	n/a	n/a	1258: Partitioned from Montfort c. 1290: Sigmaringen sold to Austria; 1338: Extinct; to Montfort-Tettnang
Montfort-Bregenz-Bregenz	County	Swab	SC	1482: Partitioned from Montfort-Bregenz-Stadeck; 1525: Sold to Austria; 1550: Extinct
Montfort-Bregenz-Montfort	County	Swab	SC	1482: Partitioned from Montfort-Bregenz-Stadeck; 1515: Extinct; to Montfort-Bregenz-Bregenz
Montfort-Bregenz-Peggau (Montfort-Bregenz-Beckach)	County	Swab	SC	1524: Renamed from Montfort-Bregenz-Pfannberg; fief of Styria; 1574: Acquired territory of Montfort-Tettnang-Rothenfels; 1581: Sold Liebenfels to Matthias Laymann; 1592: Sold Wasserburg to Fugger-Weißenhorn; 1576: Partitioned into Montfort-Bregenz-Peggau-Montfort, Montfort-Bregenz-Peggau-Tettnang and Montfort-Bregenz-Peggau-Peggau
Montfort-Bregenz-Peggau-Montfort (Montfort-Bregenz-Beckach-Montfort)	County	Swab	SC	1576: Partitioned from Montfort-Bregenz-Peggau; 1590: Extinct; to Montfort-Bregenz-Peggau-Tettnang
Montfort-Bregenz-Peggau-Peggau (Montfort-Bregenz-Beckach-Beckach)	County	n/a	n/a	1576: Partitioned from Montfort-Bregenz-Peggau; 1596: Sold Peggau; 1617: Extinct
Montfort-Bregenz-Peggau-Tettnang (Montfort-Bregenz-Beckach-Tettnang)	County	Swab	SC	1576: Partitioned from Montfort-Bregenz-Peggau; 1657: Acquired Schomburg; 1764: Liebenau sold to Weingarten Abbey; 1780: Sold to Austria; 1787: Extinct
Montfort-Bregenz-Pfannberg	County	Swab	SC	1423: Partitioned from Montfort-Tettnang-Bregenz Elder Line; 1437: Extinct; to Montfort-Bregenz-Stadeck; 1482: Partitioned from Montfort-Bregenz-Stadeck; 1524: Sold Pfannberg to Styria; renamed to Montfort-Bregenz-Peggau
Montfort-Bregenz-Stadeck	County	n/a	n/a	1423: Partitioned from Montfort-Tettnang-Bregenz Elder Line; 1482: Partitioned into Montfort-Bregenz-Bregenz, Montfort-Bregenz-Pfannberg and Montfort-Bregenz-Montfort
Montfort-Feldkirch	County	n/a	n/a	1258: Partitioned from Montfort; 1302: Partitioned into itself and Montfort-Tosters; 1375: Sold to Austria; 1390: Extinct
Montfort-Tettnang	County	n/a	n/a	1258: Partitioned from Montfort; 1287: Sold Scheer to Austria; 1314: Acquired Scheer and Friedberg; 1331: Acquired Rothenfels; 1354: Partitioned into Montfort-Tettnang-Tettnang and Montfort-Tettnang-Bregenz
Montfort-Tettnang-Bregenz	County	n/a	n/a	1354: Partitioned from Montfort-Tettnang; 1362: Acquired Pfannberg; 1379: Partitioned into Montfort-Tettnang-Bregenz Elder Line and Montfort-Tettnang-Bregenz Younger Line
Montfort-Tettnang-Bregenz Elder Line	County	n/a	n/a	1379: Partitioned from Montfort-Tettnang-Bregenz; 1423: Partitioned into Montfort-Bregenz-Pfannberg and Montfort-Bregenz-Stadeck
Montfort-Tettnang-Bregenz Younger Line	County	n/a	n/a	1379: Partitioned from Montfort-Tettnang-Bregenz; 1458: Sold to Austria
Montfort-Tettnang-Langenargen	County	n/a	n/a	1439: Partitioned from Montfort-Tettnang-Tettnang; 1445: Extinct; to Montfort-Tettnang-Rothenfels
Montfort-Tettnang-Rothenfels	County	Swab	SC	1439: Partitioned from Montfort-Tettnang-Tettnang; 1567: Rothenfels sold to Königsegg-Aulendorf; 1574: Extinct; to Montfort-Bregenz-Peggau
Montfort-Tettnang-Tettnang	County	Swab	SC	1354: Partitioned from Montfort-Tettnang; 1386: Acquired Wasserburg; 1399: Acquired Oberstaufen; 1414: Scheer and Friedberg to Zillenhard; 1420: Acquired Bludenz; 1437: Acquired Davos and Prättigau; 1439: Partitioned into itself, Montfort-Tettnang-Rothenfels and Montfort-Tettnang-Langenargen; 1526: Extinct; to Montfort-Tettnang-Rothenfels
Montfort-Toggenburg	County	n/a	n/a	1436: Henry V of Montfort-Tettnang-Tettnang obtained part of Toggenburg; 1483: Extinct; to Montfort-Tettnang-Tettnang
Montfort-Tosters	County	n/a	n/a	1302: Partitioned from Montfort-Feldkirch; 1359: Extinct; to Montfort-Feldkirch
Mosbach	Imperial City	n/a	n/a	1241: Free Imperial City; 1297: To Breuberg; 1367: To the Palatinate; 1410: To Palatinate-Mosbach; 1448: To Palatinate-Mosbach-Neumarkt; 1499: To the Palatinate; 1803: To Leiningen; 1806: To Baden
Mühlhausen	Imperial City	Low Sax	RH	1251: Free Imperial City; 1802: To Prussia; 1807: To Westphalia; 1815: To Prussia
Mulhouse (Mülhausen)	Imperial City	Upp Rhen	RH	1275: Free Imperial City; 1437: Acquired Illzach and Modenheim; 1515: Ally of the Swiss Confederation; 1648: Left the Empire as a Swiss ally 1798: To France
Münchenroth (Mönchsrot); See: Rot an der Rot	Abbacy			
Münster (Munster)	Bishopric	Low Rhen	EC	c. 795: Formed; 1122: Acquired Kappenberg as fief of Saxony; 1134: HRE Prince of the Empire c. 1170: Acquired Stromberg as fief of Saxony; 1180: Imperial immediacy 1252: Acquired Vechta; 1269: Acquired Horstmar; 1400: Acquired Ahaus; 1803: Secularised and divided between Prussia, Arenberg, Looz-Corswarem, Salm-Kyrburg, Salm-Salm and Croÿ
Munster (Münster im Gregoriental)	Imperial City	Upp Rhen	RH	1354?: Free Imperial City; 1648: To France
Murbach	Abbacy	Upp Rhen	RP	722: Formed; 792: Imperial immediacy 1648: To France; 1789: Secularised
Muri	Abbacy	n/a	n/a	1027: Formed; Abbey never held immediate territory 1648: To Switzerland; 1701: HRE Prince of the Empire
Myllendonk (Millendonk)	Lordship	Low Rhen	WE	1166: First mentioned 1268: Made fief of Guelders; 1279: Fief of the Archbishopric of Cologne; 1297: Sold to Reifferscheid-Myllendonk as fief of Cologne c. 1300: Extinct; 1346/50: To Myllendonk-Mirlaer as fief of Cologne; 1612: To Bronckhorst-Batenberg as fief of Cologne; 1641: To Croÿ-Myllendonk as fief of Cologne; 1683: To Croÿ as fief of Cologne; 1694: To Berlepsch as fief of Cologne; 1700: To Ostein; imperial immediacy, Lower Rhenish-Westphalian Circle; 1794: To France; 1815: To Prussia
