= Lower Saxon Circle =

Imperial circle of the Holy Roman Empire

Lower Saxon Circle Niedersächsischer Reichskreis
- Imperial Circle of the Holy Roman Empire
- State: Holy Roman Empire
- Established: 1500
- Convocation city: Halberstadt (often); also Lüneburg and Braunschweig

Government
  - Type: Circle Diet (Kreistag)
  - Director(s): Archbishop of Magdeburg & Duke of Bremen (later Brandenburg-Prussia & House of Hanover)

The Lower Saxon Circle at the beginning of the 16th century

The Lower Saxon Circle (German: Niedersächsischer Reichskreis) was an imperial circle of the Holy Roman Empire. It covered much of the territory of the medieval Duchy of Saxony (except for Westphalia), and was originally called the Saxon Circle (German: Sächsischer Kreis) before later being better differentiated from the Upper Saxon Circle by the more specific name. An unusual aspect of this circle was that, at various times, the kings of Denmark (in Holstein), Great Britain (in Hanover) and Sweden (in Bremen) were all Princes of several Imperial States.

== Origin ==
The first plans for a Lower Saxon Circle originated from Albert II of Germany in 1438. An Imperial Saxon Circle was formally created in 1500, but in 1512 it was divided into an Upper Saxon and Lower Saxon Circle. The division was only codified in 1522, and it took a while before the separation was completely implemented by the Imperial Chamber Court. Furthermore, the first mention of an Upper Saxon Circle, a Lower Saxon Circle or the Netherlands occurred much later on. The term Lower Saxony (Niedersachsen) was first used only in 1548.

== Territory ==
The Lower Saxon Circle included the easternmost part of current Lower Saxony, the northernmost part of Saxony-Anhalt (excluding the Altmark), Mecklenburg, Holstein (excluding Dithmarschen), Hamburg, Bremen, in addition to small areas in Brandenburg and Thuringia. For the most part, it was a continuous territory except for small enclaves like Halle and Jüterbog. Nordhausen and Mühlhausen were also areas outside the continuous portion of the imperial circle. Within the circle was the Prince-Bishopric of Verden, which was in personal union with the Archbishopric of Bremen since 1502. The Counties of Schaumburg and Spiegelberg were also part of the personal union, but they were not a part of the Lower Saxon Circle.

By the downfall of the Holy Roman Empire, the circle had 2,120,00 inhabitants and an area of 1,240 square miles. Concerning religion, almost all the citizens were Protestant. The exception was the partially Catholic Bishopric of Hildesheim.

== Structure ==
A large part of the circle was made up of territories ruled by the House of Welf. With the Protestant Reformation the newly converted Archbishopric of Magdeburg was ruled from 1513 by administrators from the Brandenburg line of the House of Hohenzollern. Also, in 1648 the Bishopric of Halberstadt was given to the Margraviate of Brandenburg. The Archbishopric of Bremen, after the Reformation, was ruled by Danes and Swedes, and after 1715 by the House of Welf. Through the Duchy of Oldenburg, the king of Denmark became a prince of the imperial circle.

Also as a result of their possessions in the imperial circles, the kings of Prussia, Sweden, and Great Britain, who governed the Electorate of Brunswick-Lüneburg, became princes of the empire. Out of the entire empire, the Lower Saxon Circle was ruled the most by foreign kings. Regardless of this, the House of Welf's strong position with the Lower Saxon Circle prevented the dukes of Mecklenburg and the kings of Denmark from completely dominating.

== Composition ==
The circle was made up of the following states:

Name	Type of entity	Comments
Bremen	Duchy	Archbishopric of Bremen established in 787 by Charlemagne, secularized in 1648 as fief of Sweden, ceded to Great Britain in 1715; 12th seat to the Reichstag
Bremen	Imperial City	8th Rhenish City from 1186
Brunswick-Calenberg	Duchy	Subdivision of Brunswick-Lüneburg from 1494, united with Celle in 1705 to form Hanover, 34th seat to the Reichstag
Brunswick-Celle	Duchy	Subdivision of Brunswick-Lüneburg from 1269 until 1705, 32nd seat to the Reichstag
Brunswick-Grubenhagen	Duchy	Subdivision of Brunswick-Lüneburg from 1291 until 1596, 36th seat to the Reichstag
Brunswick-Wolfenbüttel	Duchy	Subdivision of Brunswick-Lüneburg from 1269, included Blankenburg, became Duchy of Brunswick after Napoleon, 38th seat to the Reichstag
Gandersheim	Imperial Abbacy	Established in 852 by Duke Liudolf of Saxony, Immediacy confirmed by King Henry the Fowler in 919, contested by Brunswick-Wolfenbüttel, 18th Prelature of the Rhine
Goslar	Imperial City	From 1290
Halberstadt	Prince-Bishopric	Established by Charlemagne in 804, secularized in 1648 as Principality of Halberstadt held by Brandenburg
Hamburg	Imperial City	9th Rhenish City from 1189
Hildesheim	Prince-Bishopric	Established in 815 by Louis the Pious; 27th seat to the Reichstag
Holstein	Duchy	Established in 1474, held by the Danish Royal House of Oldenburg, from 1648 residence in Glückstadt
Holstein-Gottorp	Duchy	Subdivision of Holstein from 1544 until 1773
Lübeck	Prince-Bishopric	Established in 1160 by Henry the Lion, 49th seat to the Reichstag
Lübeck	Imperial City	3rd Rhenish City, from 1226
Magdeburg	Prince-Archbishopric; Duchy	Established in 955 by Otto I as Archbishopric of Magdeburg, secularized in 1680, held by Brandenburg
Mecklenburg-Schwerin	Duchy	Established in 1352
Mecklenburg-Güstrow	Duchy	Subdivision of Mecklenburg-Schwerin from 1520 until 1552, again from 1621 until 1695
Mecklenburg-Strelitz	Duchy	Subdivision of Mecklenburg-Schwerin from 1701
Mühlhausen	Imperial City	From 1251
Nordhausen	Imperial City	From 1220
Rantzau	County	Established in 1650, held by the Danish Royal House of Oldenburg from 1734
Ratzeburg	Prince-Bishopric	Established in 1154 by Henry the Lion, secularized in 1648 as Principality of Ratzeburg, held by the Dukes of Mecklenburg, Mecklenburg-Strelitz from 1701
Regenstein	County	From about 1160, united with Blankenburg in 1368, held by the Dukes of Brunswick-Wolfenbüttel from 1599
Saxe-Lauenburg	Duchy	Established in 1296, in 1689 fell to the Dukes of Brunswick-Calenberg, 66th seat to the Reichstag
Schwerin	Prince-Bishopric	Established in 1154 by Henry the Lion, residence at Bützow from 1239, secularized in 1648 as a principality held by the Dukes of Mecklenburg-Schwerin

== Sources ==
- The list of states making up the Lower Saxon Circle is based on that in the German Wikipedia article Niedersächsischer Reichskreis.
