= Lemberg, Moselle =

Lemberg
- Commune
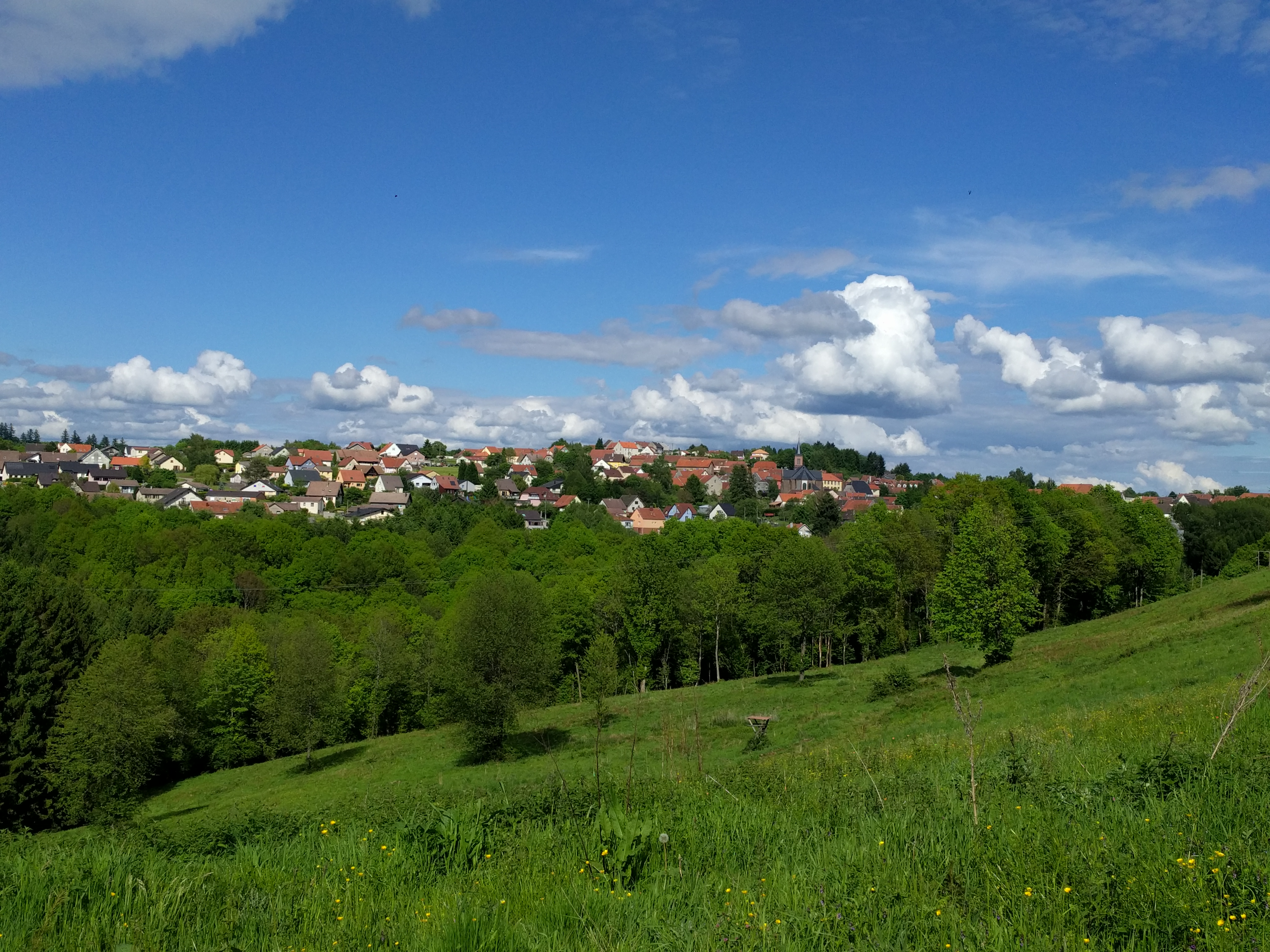
- Village view

- Coat of arms
- Location of Lemberg
- Location within France Location within Grand Est
- Coordinates: 49°00′18″N 7°22′48″E
- Country: France
- Region: Grand Est
- Department: Moselle
- Arrondissement: Sarreguemines
- Canton: Bitche
- Intercommunality: CC du Pays de Bitche

Government
  - Mayor (2020–2026): Jean-Marc Wagner
- Area^{1}: 10.94 km^{2} (4.22 sq mi)
- Elevation: 339 m (1,112 ft)
- Highest elevation: 427 m (1,401 ft)
- Lowest elevation: 251 m (823 ft)
- Population (2023): 1,428
  - Density: 130.5/km^{2} (338.1/sq mi)
- Time zone: UTC+01:00 (CET)
  - Summer (DST): UTC+02:00 (CEST)
- INSEE/Postal code: 57390 /57620
- ^{1} French Land Register data, which excludes lakes, ponds, glaciers > 1 km^{2} (0.386 sq mi or 247 acres) and river estuaries.

Lemberg (French pronunciation: [lɛmbɛʁɡ]; Lorraine Franconian: Lembärsch) is a commune in the Moselle department of the Grand Est administrative region in north-eastern France.

The village belongs to the Pays de Bitche and to the Northern Vosges Regional Nature Park. As of the 2013 France census, the village's population is 1,483. The inhabitants of the commune are known as Lembergeois and Lembergeoises.

== See also ==
- Communes of the Moselle department
