= Imperial village =

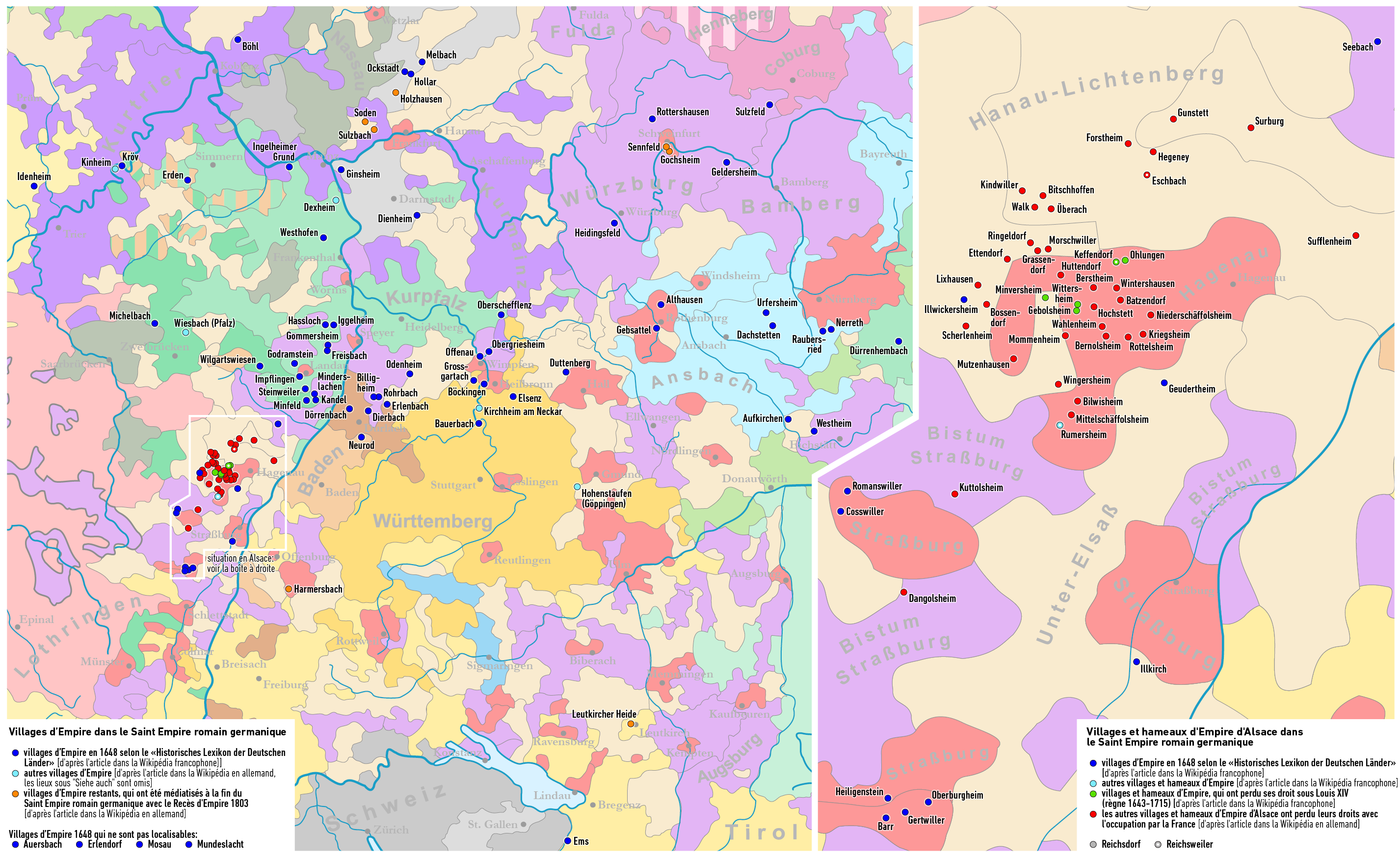
Map of the imperial villages (as of 1618)

The Imperial villages (German: Reichsdörfer [ˈʁaɪçsˌdœʁfɐ], singular Reichsdorf [ˈʁaɪçsˌdɔʁf]) were the smallest component entities of the Holy Roman Empire. They possessed imperial immediacy, having no lord but the Emperor, but were not estates. They were unencircled and did not have representation in the Imperial Diet. In all these respects they were similar to the Imperial Knights; the inhabitants of imperial villages were free men (being not serfs or similar feudal status).

== Imperial villages ==
The imperial villages—relics of the royal demesne during the era of the Hohenstaufen—were all located in southern and western Germany and in Alsace. Originally there were 120 villages, but this number was greatly reduced during the early modern period. At the Peace of Westphalia in 1648, forty imperial villages in Alsace passed to France. In this Alsatian group were several even smaller entities known as imperial hamlets (Reichsweiler).

At the time of the Reichsdeputationshauptschluss, the final Imperial reform in 1803, only five imperial villages remained: Gochsheim, Sennfeld, Holzhausen, Soden and Sulzbach. Holzhausen was a condominium village, two thirds of which was immediate to the Emperor and the remaining third subject to various landlords. In addition, the Free Men of the Leutkircher Heath in the Allgäu constituted a free peasant republic often counted among the imperial villages. Although constitutionally the smallest entities of the Empire, the size of an imperial village varied. Territory of the Free Men of the Leutkircher Heath surrounded the Imperial City of Leutkirch on three sides and its area was nearly four times as large.

These villages had preserved their rights of justice and their free status for centuries without force of arms, a "testimony to the progressive 'juridification' of the Reich".

== Imperial valleys ==
The imperial valley (Reichstal) of the Harmersbach was an immediate territory in the Harmersbach river valley of the Black Forest near the Kinzig, which existed in the late 17th and 18th centuries. Politically, it possessed a similar structure to the Free Men of the Leutkircher Heath, yet was the only officially designated Reichstal in the Empire. The Reichstal was approached from the Free Imperial City of Zell am Harmersbach at the mouth of the valley. Although medieval leases placed the Reichstal under the legal power of Zell, disputes finally led the Emperor Leopold I to dissolve the contract in 1689, and the valley's complete immediacy to the Emperor was recognized in 1718. The Reichstal was annexed by Baden in 1806.

== Imperial hamlets ==
Imperial hamlets (Reichsweiler) included Gebolsheim.

== Imperial farmsteads ==
Imperial farmsteads (Reichshöfe) included Lustenau.

== Termination ==
In 1803, a major political reorganization took place, greatly reducing the number of political entities in Germany (see German mediatisation). At this time, the few remaining imperial villages and similar entities were incorporated into neighboring, larger political units (Kümin 2015). The Holy Roman Empire was itself terminated three years later, in 1806.

== See also ==
- List of Imperial Villages

== Sources ==
- Kümin, Beat (2015). "Rural Autonomy and Popular Politics in Imperial Villages" (PDF). German History. 33 (2): 194–213. doi:10.1093/gerhis/ghv057.
- Kümin, Beat (2019). Imperial Villages: Cultures of Political Freedom in the German Lands, c. 1300–1800. Brill. doi:10.1163/9789004396609. ISBN 9789004396609. S2CID 182710939.
- Whaley, Joachim (2012). Germany and the Holy Roman Empire, Volume I: Maximilian I to the Peace of Westphalia, 1493–1648. Oxford: Oxford University Press.
