= List of free imperial cities =

There were 51 free imperial cities in the Holy Roman Empire as of 1792. They are listed here with their official confessional status confirmed by the Peace of Westphalia (1648).

- Aachen (Catholic)
- Aalen (Lutheran)
- Augsburg (bi-denominational)
- Biberach (bi-denominational)
- Bopfingen (Lutheran)
- Bremen (Calvinist)
- Buchau (Catholic)
- Buchhorn (Catholic)
- Cologne (Catholic)
- Dinkelsbühl (bi-denominational)
- Dortmund (Lutheran)
- Esslingen am Neckar (Lutheran)
- Frankfurt am Main (bi-denominational, mostly Lutheran but the vote for a new emperor was held in the Catholic cathedral of Frankfurt)
- Friedberg (Lutheran)
- Gengenbach (Catholic)
- Giengen (Lutheran)
- Goslar (Lutheran)
- Hamburg (Lutheran)
- Heilbronn (Lutheran)
- Isny im Allgäu (Lutheran)
- Kaufbeuren (Lutheran)
- Kempten (Lutheran)
- Leutkirch im Allgäu (Lutheran)
- Lindau (Lutheran)
- Lübeck (Lutheran)
- Memmingen (Lutheran)
- Mühlhausen (Lutheran)
- Nordhausen (Lutheran)
- Nördlingen (Lutheran)
- Nuremberg (Lutheran)
- Offenburg (Catholic)
- Pfullendorf (Catholic)
- Ravensburg (bi-denominational)
- Regensburg (Lutheran)
- Reutlingen (Lutheran)
- Rothenburg ob der Tauber (Lutheran)
- Rottweil (Catholic)
- Schwäbisch Gmünd (Catholic)
- Schwäbisch Hall (Lutheran)
- Schweinfurt (Lutheran)
- Speyer (Lutheran)
- Überlingen (Catholic)
- Ulm (Lutheran)
- Wangen (Catholic)
- Weil (Catholic)
- Weißenburg in Bayern (Nordgau) (Lutheran)
- Wetzlar (Lutheran)
- Wimpfen (Lutheran)
- Windsheim (Lutheran)
- Worms (Lutheran)
- Zell am Harmersbach (Catholic)

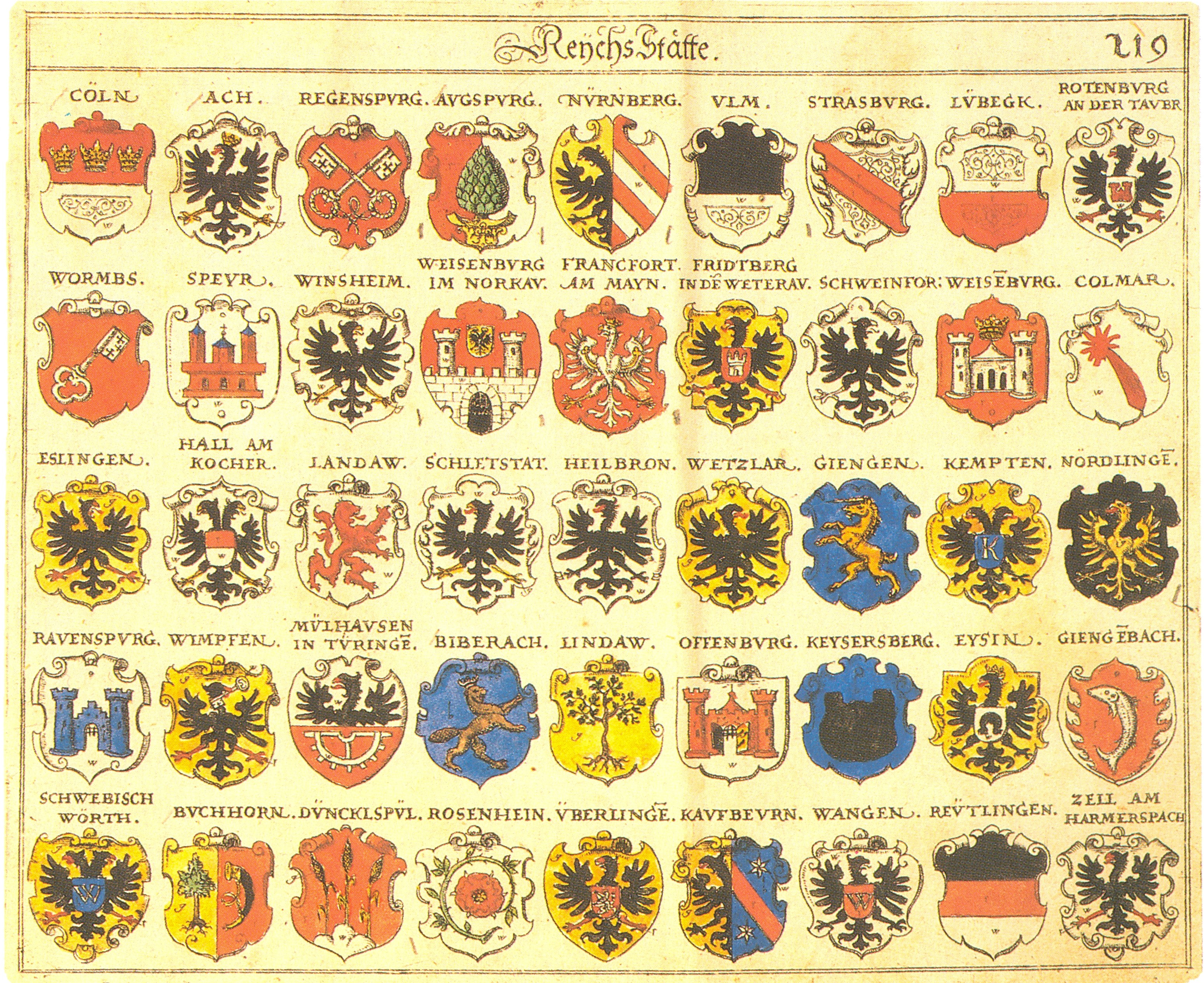
Coats of Arms of the Free Imperial Cities (of 1605) – part 1

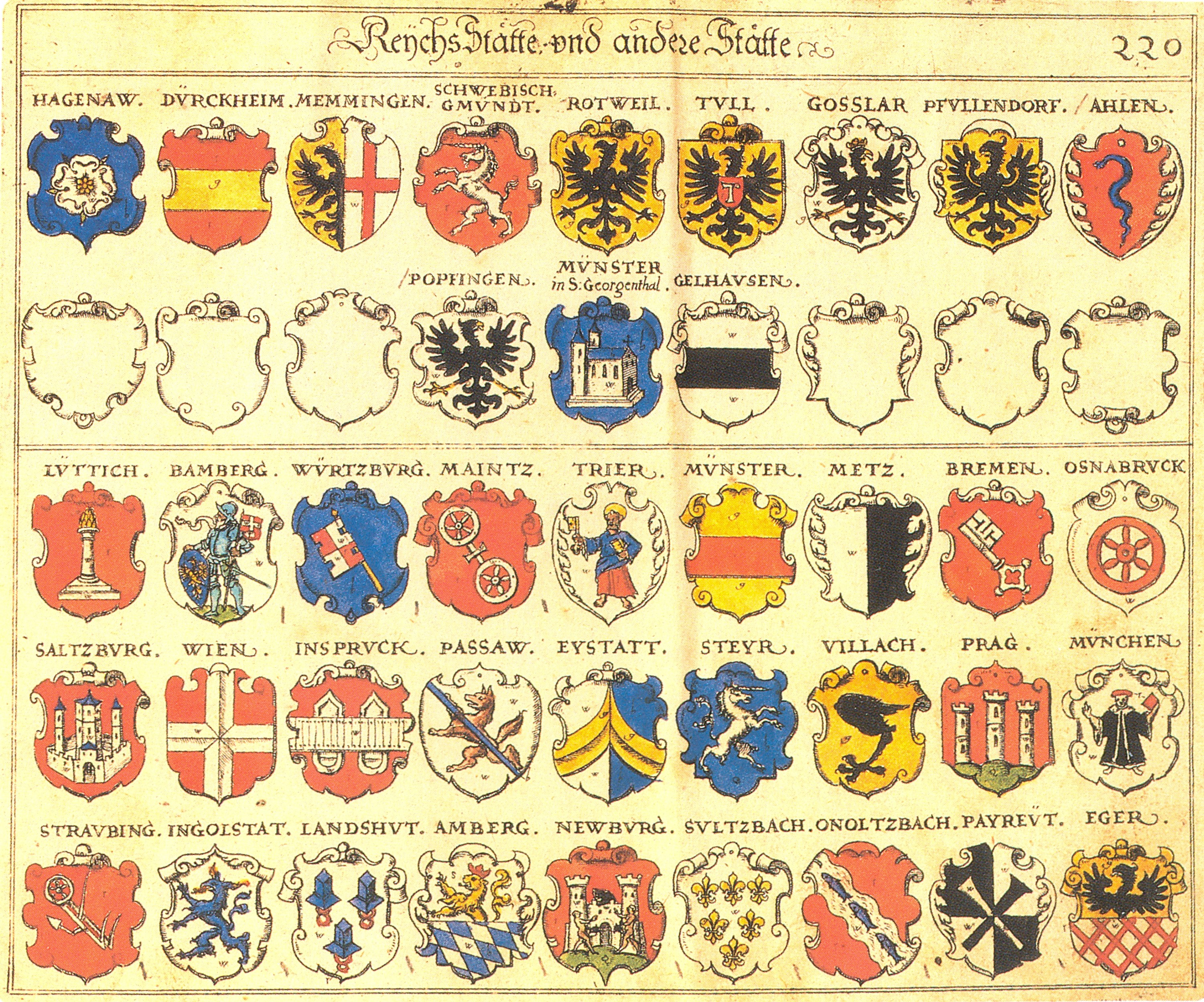
Coats of Arms of the Free Imperial Cities (of 1605) – part 2 (two top rows only)

In many of these coats of arms, an eagle reflects the direct association with the Holy Roman Emperor, whose own standard was that of an imperial eagle.

Other cities which were once Free Imperial cities, but had ceased to be so by 1792, include:

- Baden (formally only?)
- Basel (became a Swiss Canton, 1501, independence from the Empire recognized 1648)
- Bern (became a Swiss Canton, 1351, independence recognized 1648)
- Bisanz (Besançon) (annexed by Spain, 1648)
- Brakel (annexed by the bishop of Paderborn)
- Bremgarten (formally only?)
- Boppard (to Electorate of Trier)
- Kamerich (Cambrai) (to the Spanish Netherlands, 1543)
- Diessenhofen
- Deventer
- Donauwörth (to Bavaria, 1617)
- Duisburg (to Cleves, 1290)
- Düren (to Jülich)
- Frauenfeld
- Freiburg im Üechtland (Fribourg) (became a Swiss Canton)
- Füssen (to the Prince-Bishopric of Augsburg, 1313)
- Gelnhausen (to Hesse-Kassel (or Hesse-Cassel), 1745)
- Hagenau (annexed by France, 1670s)
- Herford (to Brandenburg)
- Colmar (annexed by France, 1673, confirmed 1697)
- Kampen
- Kaisersberg (annexed by France, 1648)
- Kessenich
- Konstanz (annexed by Austria, 1548)
- Landau (annexed by France, 1648)
- Lemgo (to Lippe)
- Lucerne (became a Swiss Canton, independence recognized 1648)
- Mainz (returned to the control of its archbishop, 1462)
- Metz (annexed by France, 1552)
- Mülhausen (Mulhouse) (an associate of the Swiss Confederation after 1648, annexed by France, 1798)
- Münster im Elsass (annexed by France, 1648)
- Murten (to Savoy, 1255)
- Nijmegen (to Guelders, 1247)
- Oberehnheim (annexed by France, 1648)
- Rapperswil
- Rheinfelden (to the Habsburgs, 1330)
- Riga (to the Polish–Lithuanian Commonwealth, 1581)
- Rosheim (annexed by France, 1648)
- Saarburg (Sarrebourg) (annexed by France)
- Schaffhausen (became a Swiss Canton, 1501, independence recognized 1648)
- Schmalkalden (to Hesse, 1581)
- Schlettstadt (Sélestat) (annexed by France, 1670s)
- Solothurn (became a Swiss Canton, 1481, independence recognized 1648)
- Strassburg (annexed by France, 1681, confirmed 1697)
- Toul (annexed by France, 1552)
- Türkheim (Turckheim) (annexed by France, 1648)
- Verden (to Duchy of Verden, 1648)
- Verdun (annexed by France, 1552)
- Warburg (annexed by the prince-bishop of Paderborn)
- Winterthur
- Weißenburg (Wissembourg) (annexed by France, 1648)
- Zug (became a Swiss Canton, independence recognized 1648)
- Zürich (became a Swiss Canton, 1351, independence recognized 1648)

== Confederations ==
- Hanseatic League
- Décapole
