= Electoral Rhenish Circle =

Imperial circle of the Holy Roman Empire

The Electoral Rhenish Circle as at the beginning of the 16th century

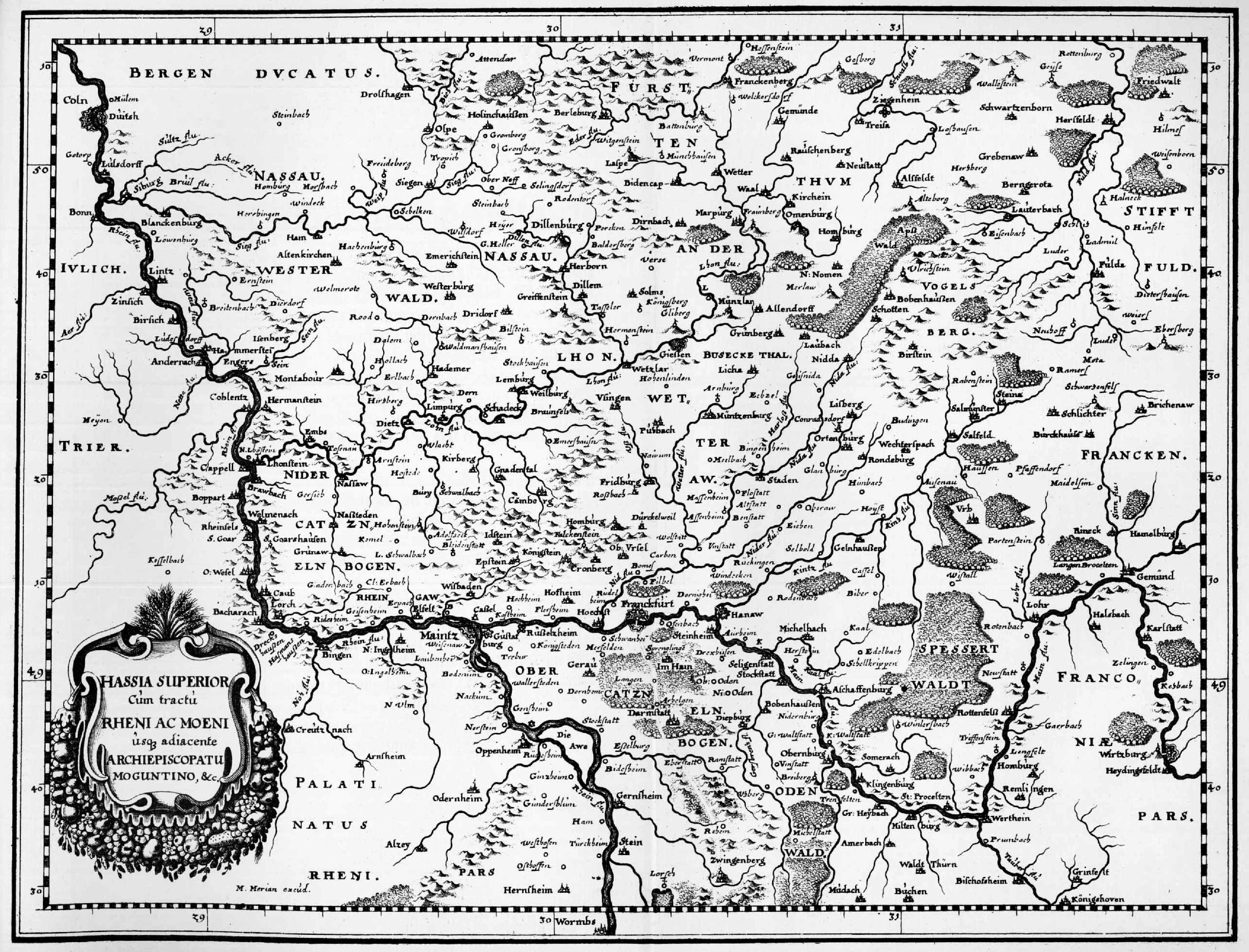
map of the Electoral Rhenish Circle from Topographia Archiepiscopatuum Moguntinensis by Matthäus Merian, 1646

The Electoral Rhenish Circle (German: Kurrheinischer Reichskreis) was an imperial circle of the Holy Roman Empire, created in 1512. The circle derived its name from four of the seven prince-electors whose lands along the Middle Rhine comprised the vast majority of its territory.

== Composition ==
The circle was made up of the following states:

| Name | Type of entity | Comments |
|---|---|---|
| Beilstein | Lordship | Held by the Counts of Nassau-Dillenburg from 1343 |
| Cologne | Prince-bishopric | (Re-)established by King Otto I in 953, Prince-elector and Archchancellor of Italy in 1356; including Vest Recklinghausen and the Duchy of Westphalia |
| Koblenz | Bailiwick | An administrative grouping of lands including the immediate Lordship of Elsen, held by the Teutonic Knights, 2nd Rhenish Prelate |
| Mainz | Prince-bishopric | Archbishopric established in 781 by Pope Adrian I, Prince-elector and Archchancellor of Germany in 1356; including Eichsfeld, Erfurt, and Aschaffenburg |
| Nieder-Isenburg | County | Emerged from Isenburg-Isenburg in 1199, partitioned in 1502 into Isenburg-Grenzau and Isenburg-Neumagen (to Sayn-Wittgenstein in 1554), extinct in 1664 |
| Palatinate | County palatine | Arose from the allodium of the Count palatine of Lower Lorraine in 1085 under Henry of Laach, held by the House of Wittelsbach from 1214, Prince-elector and Truchsess in 1356 |
| Rheineck | Burgraviate | Fiefdom of Cologne around Rheineck Castle, held by the Freiherren of Varsberg from 1576 |
| Thurn und Taxis | Barons | Briefadel without territory, Freiherren from 1608, Counts from 1624, raised to Princely Counts in 1695 |
| Trier | Prince-bishopric | Established in 902, Prince-elector and Archchancellor of Burgundy (Arles) in 1356 |

== Sources ==
- The list of states making up the Electoral Rhenish Circle is based on that in the German Wikipedia article Kurrheinischer Reichskreis.
