= Austrian Circle =

Imperial circle of the Holy Roman Empire

Austrian Circle Österreichischer Reichskreis
- Imperial circle of the Holy Roman Empire
- 1512–1806
- The Austrian Circle as at the beginning of the 16th century within the Holy Roman Empire
- History
  - Established: 1512
  - Disestablished: 1806
- Today part of: Austria; Croatia; Czech Republic; France; Germany; Italy; Liechtenstein; Slovenia; Switzerland

The Austrian Circle (German: Österreichischer Reichskreis) was an imperial circle of the Holy Roman Empire. It was one of the four imperial circles created by decree after the 1512 Diet at Cologne, twelve years after the original six Circles were established in the course of the Imperial Reform. It roughly corresponds to present-day Austria (except for Salzburg and Burgenland), Slovenia, and the Trentino-Alto Adige/Südtirol and Venezia Giulia regions of Northern Italy, but also comprised the Further Austrian territories in the former Swabian stem duchy.

== Organisation ==
The Austrian Circle was largely coterminous with the "Hereditary Lands" (Erblande) of the House of Habsburg, dominated by the Archduchy of Austria. Beside the Habsburg lands, which had a single collective seat to the Reichstag, it included the Prince-Bishoprics of Trent and Brixen, which, however, were largely ruled within the Habsburg lands of Tyrol, and some little vassal principalities.

The Circle's territory was again enlarged with the acquisition of the Bavarian Innviertel according to the 1779 Treaty of Teschen, as well as the Electorate of Salzburg and the Berchtesgaden Provostry by the German mediatisation in 1803. Nevertheless, the Austrian Circle was dissolved when Emperor Francis II resigned on 6 August 1806.

== Composition ==
The circle was made up of the following states:

| Name | Type of entity | Comments |
|---|---|---|
| Auersperg | Principality | Thengen was originally a rear county held by the Mainau commandery of the Teutonic Order since 1488, front county to Further Austria in 1522. The Prince of Auersperg pegged his 88th Reichstag seat here from 1663. |
| An der Etsch | Bailiwick | Established about 1260, an administrative grouping of lands held by the Teutonic Knights in Tyrol |
| Austria | Archduchy | March of Austria established in 976 by Emperor Otto II, raised to duchy by Emperor Frederick I Barbarossa in 1156, to Habsburg in 1278, self-bestowed "Archduchy" since 1358, 1st Reichstag seat |
| Austrian Bailiwick | Bailiwick | An administrative grouping of lands held by the Teutonic Order in Austria |
| Brixen | Prince-Bishopric | Established in 1027 by Emperor Conrad II, Prince-Bishopric since 1179, 39th seat to the Reichstag |
| Carinthia | Duchy | Established in 976 by Emperor Otto II, held by the Archdukes of Austria since 1457, part of Inner Austria 1564–1619 |
| Carniola | Duchy | March of Carniola established in 1040 by Emperor Henry III, raised to duchy in 1364, held by the Archdukes of Austria since 1457, part of Inner Austria 1564–1619; owns Inner Istria, a March established in 1040 by Emperor Henry III, the little remaining territory around Pazin (Mitterburg) to Austria since 1374 |
| Chur | Prince-Bishopric | Established in the 4th century, principality since 1170, held by the League of God's House since 1367, 51st seat to the Reichstag, from Swabia to Austria in 1720 |
| Dietrichstein | Principality | Former Barony of Tarasp held by the Archdukes of Austria since 1464 and rented to the Princely family in 1678 with the 85th seat in the Reichstag |
| Gorizia | County | Separated from the Patriarchate of Aquileia about 1127, held by the Archdukes of Austria from 1500, part of Inner Austria 1564-1619, merged into Gorizia and Gradisca in 1747 |
| Styria | Duchy | March of Styria established about 970 by Emperor Otto I, raised to a duchy in 1180, held by the Dukes of Austria since 1192, part of Inner Austria 1564-1619 |
| Trent | Prince-Bishopric | Established in 1027 by Emperor Conrad II, 37th seat to the Reichstag |
| Trieste | City | Held by the Archdukes of Austria since 1382 |
| Tyrol | County | Established about 1140, held by the Archdukes of Austria since 1363, raised to "Princely County" in 1504, to Further Austria 1564-1665 |
