= Imperial circle =

Administrative groupings of the Holy Roman Empire

A map of the imperial circles in 1560 Burgundian Circle Lower Rhenish–Westphalian Circle Electoral Rhenish Circle Upper Rhenish Circle Lower Saxon Circle Upper Saxon Circle Franconian Circle Swabian Circle Bavarian Circle Austrian Circle Unencircled territories

In Europe during the early modern period, the Holy Roman Empire was divided into imperial circles (Latin: Circuli imperii; German: Reichskreise [ˈʁaɪçsˌkʁaɪzə]; singular: Circulus imperii, Reichskreis [ˈʁaɪçsˌkʁaɪs]), administrative groupings whose primary purposes were the organization of common defensive structure and the collection of imperial taxes. They were also used as a means of organization within the Imperial Diet and the Imperial Chamber Court. Each circle had a circle diet, although not every member of the circle diet would hold membership of the Imperial Diet as well.

Six imperial circles were introduced at the Diet of Augsburg in 1500. In 1512, three more circles were added, and the large Saxon Circle was split into two, so that from 1512 until the collapse of the Holy Roman Empire in the Napoleonic era, there were ten imperial circles. The Crown of Bohemia, the Swiss Confederacy and Italy remained unencircled, as did various minor territories which held imperial immediacy and mostly regrouped the semi-official Kingdom of Germany and the remains of the Kingdom of Arles.

== Formation ==
Initially the 1500 Diet of Augsburg set up six imperial circles as part of the Imperial Reform:

- the Bavarian Circle
- the Franconian Circle
- the Saxon Circle
- the Swabian Circle
- the Upper Rhenish Circle
- the Lower Rhenish-Westphalian Circle

Originally, the territories held by the Habsburg dynasty and the electors remained unencircled. In 1512, the Diet at Trier and Cologne organized these lands into three more circles:

- the Austrian Circle, including the Habsburg territories inherited by Maximilian I
- the Burgundian Circle, including the patrimony of Maximilian's late wife, Mary of Burgundy
- the Electoral Rhenish Circle, including the ecclesiastical Electorates of Mainz, Cologne and Trier, and the secular Electorate of the Palatinate.

Also, the Saxon Circle was divided into:

- the Lower Saxon Circle
- the Upper Saxon Circle, including the Electorates of Saxony and Brandenburg

Although the empire lost several western territories after the secession of the Seven United Netherlands in 1581 and during the French annexations of the 1679 Peace of Nijmegen, the ten circles remained largely unchanged until the early 1790s, when the French Revolutionary Wars brought about significant changes to the political map of Europe.

Some of the circles were de facto controlled by a powerful noble house. The Austrian Circle corresponded almost exactly with the Habsburg hereditary lands. The Burgundian Circle encompassed the territory controlled by the Spanish Habsburgs (Franche-Comte and the Habsburg Netherlands). The Bavarian Circle mostly consisted of the Wittelsbach Duchy of Bavaria plus its satellites. The Upper Saxon Circle was dominated by the electorates of Saxony (plus its satellite Ernestine duchies) and Brandenburg.

== Responsibilities ==
The Imperial Circles were extremely important in the administration of the Holy Roman Empire. In 1747, Friedrich Carl Moser noted that "the preservation of the imperial system depends largely upon . . . the western imperial circles." Some historians go even farther, like Hanns Hubert Hofmann, who suggests that "all real state-like functions of the Reich lay exclusively with the circles, not the diet."

At first, starting as elective districts in 1500, the powers of the Imperial Circles gradually expanded. In 1512 they became responsible for enforcing decrees of the Reichskammergericht, the Imperial Chamber Court. In 1530, they were made responsible for mobilizing contingents of the Reichsarmee, and by 1555, they were responsible for protecting the public peace within the Empire. In 1559, they began to regulate imperial coinage.

The Peace of Augsburg in 1555 also drew upon the first attempts at local organization in the circles, particularly in the Swabian Circle. It created a fixed constitution for the circles and gave them authority to keep civil and religious peace in their territories. The princes in each circle met in local assemblies called the Kreistag, and as such, the circles became a substitute for imperial bureaucracy. After 1555, several circles became effective governmental bodies, especially in Swabia, Franconia, and Lower Saxony. Not only did they carry out orders from the Imperial Diet and Courts, but they also enacted their own legislation. Examples of such include economics, police, and military affairs.

By 1648, some of the Imperial Circles, which became dominated by one or two major powers, began to lose their function. The Austrian and Burgundian circles, both dominated by possessions of the Habsburgs, never developed full constitutions in the first place. Both Saxon circles (for example the Upper Saxon Circle was dominated by Brandenburg and Saxony) stopped convening by 1683, and the Bavarian circle only met on occasion to decide military measures.

== Unencircled territories ==
A number of imperial territories remained unencircled, notably the lands of the Bohemian crown, the Old Swiss Confederacy and most of the Italian territories. Besides these, there were also a considerable number of minor territories which retained imperial immediacy, such as individual Imperial Villages, and the lands held by individual Imperial Knights.

== Literature ==
Contemporary (1500–1806) literature and source material:

- Wolfgang Wüst (ed.): Die "gute" Policey im Reichskreis. Zur frühmodernen Normensetzung in den Kernregionen des Alten Reiches, edition of primary sources in four volumes, vol. 1: Der Schwäbische Reichskreis, unter besonderer Berücksichtigung Bayerisch-Schwabens, Berlin 2001; vol. 2: Der Fränkische Reichskreis, Berlin 2003; vol. 3: Der Bayerische Reichskreis und die Oberpfalz, Berlin 2004; vol.: Die lokale Policey: Normensetzung und Ordnungspolitik auf dem Lande. Ein Quellenwerk, Berlin 2008.
- Hernach volgend die Zehen Krayß, 1532.
- Johannes Alhusius: Politica methodice digesta. 3.Aufl., Herborn 1614.
- Martin Zeiller: Von den zehn Kreisen. 1660, 1694.
- Johann Samuel Tromsdorff: Accurate neue und alte Geographie von ganz Teutschland. Frankfurt 1711 (pp. 128ff).
- "Creiß" in: Zedler, Grosses vollständiges Universallexikon aller Wissenschaften und Künste, vol. 6 (Ci – Cz), 1733.
