= List of states in the Holy Roman Empire (N) =

This is a list of states in the Holy Roman Empire beginning with the letter N. Some historians mark the beginning of the Empire as 800, with the coronation of Frankish king Charlemagne ("Charles the Great").

Name	Type	Imperial circle	Imperial diet	History
Namur	County; 1194: Margraviate	Burg	n/a	998: Gaugrave ("gau count") in Lommegau invested with title Namur; 1067: Partitioned into itself and Durbuy; 1099: Acquired Brunengeruz; 1102: Partitioned into itself and La Roche c. 1147: Acquired Durbuy; 1153: Acquired La Roche; 1155: Acquired Grevenmacher; 1189: La Roche and Durbuy to Luxembourg; Namur made a fief of Hainaut; 1194: HRE Margrave; 1256: To Luxembourg; 1268: To Flanders; 1305: Partitioned from Flanders; 1362: Imperial immediacy 1429: Sold to Burgundy; 1483: To the Burgundian Netherlands; 1516: To the Spanish Netherlands; 1713: To the Austrian Netherlands; 1794: To France; 1815: To the Netherlands; 1830: To Belgium
Nassau	County	n/a	n/a	1159: Counts of Laurenburg assumed the name Nassau; fief of the Archbishopric of Trier; 1192: Imperial immediacy 1255: Partitioned into Nassau Ottonian Line and Nassau Walramian Line
Nassau; Duke of Nassau, Count Palatine of the Rhine, Count of Sayn, Königstein, Katzenelnbogen & Dietz, Burgrave of Hammerstein, Lord of Mahlberg, Wiesbaden, Idstein, Merenberg, Limburg & Eppstein	Duchy	n/a	n/a	1806: Formed for Nassau-Usingen; 1866: To Prussia
Nassau-Beilstein	County	Low Rhen	n/a	1343: Partitioned from Nassau-Siegen; 1380: Partitioned into itself and Nassau-Liebenscheid; 1425: Partitioned into itself and Nassau-Liebenscheid; 1513: Partitioned into itself and Nassau-Liebenscheid; 1561: Extinct; to Nassau-Dillenburg; 1607: Partitioned from Nassau-Dillenburg; 1620: Inherited and renamed to Nassau-Dillenburg
Nassau-Breda	County	Low Rhen	n/a	1475: Partitioned from Nassau-Dillenburg; 1538: In personal union with Châlon-Orange; 1544: Extinct; to Nassau-Dillenburg
Nassau-Dillenburg	County; 1654: Principality	Low Rhen	n/a	1303: Partitioned from Nassau Ottonian Line; 1308: Acquired Kalenberg as fief of the Bishopric of Worms; 1310: Acquired Nederoth and Heimau; 1328: Extinct; given to Otto II of Nassau-Siegen, a son of the ruling count 1343: Acquired half of Nassau-Siegen; 1403: Acquired Breda by marriage 1475: Partitioned into Nassau-Breda and itself 1559: Partitioned into Orange-Nassau and itself 1607: Partitioned into itself, Nassau-Siegen, Nassau-Beilstein, Nassau-Dietz and Nassau-Hadamar; 1654: HRE Prince; 1739: Extinct; divided between Nassau-Siegen Catholic Line and Orange-Nassau
Nassau-Dietz	County; 1654: Principality	Low Rhen	n/a	1607: Partitioned from Nassau-Dillenburg; 1654: HRE Prince; 1702: Superseded by Orange-Nassau
Nassau-Gleiberg	County	Upp Rhen	WT	1593: Partitioned from Nassau-Weilburg; 1602: Extinct; to Nassau-Ottweiler; 1627: Partitioned from Nassau-Saarbrücken; 1632: Extinct; divided between Nassau-Saarbrücken, Nassau-Idstein and Nassau-Weilburg
Nassau-Hadamar	County; 1650: Principality	Low Rhen	n.a	1303: Partitioned from Nassau Ottonian Line; 1394: Extinct; to Nassau-Dillenburg; 1607: Partitioned from Nassau-Dillenburg; 1643: Esterau and Isselbach sold to Holzappel; 1650: HRE Prince; 1711: Extinct; divided between Orange-Nassau, Nassau-Dillenburg, Nassau-Siegen Catholic Line and Nassau-Siegen Calvinist Line
Nassau-Idstein	County; 1688: Principality	Upp Rhen	WT	1370: Partitioned from Nassau-Wiesbaden-Idstein; 1386: Renamed to Nassau-Wiesbaden-Idstein; 1480: Partitioned from Nassau-Wiesbaden-Idstein; 1509: Extinct; to Nassau-Wiesbaden; 1627: Partitioned from Nassau-Saarbrücken; 1635: Under imperial ban 1648: Restored; 1688: HRE Prince; 1721: Extinct; to Nassau-Ottweiler
Nassau-Liebenscheid	County	Low Rhen	n/a	1380: Partitioned from Nassau-Beilstein; 1414/8: Extinct; to Nassau-Beilstein; 1425: Partitioned from Nassau-Beilstein; 1477: Extinct; to Nassau-Beilstein; 1513: Partitioned from Nassau-Beilstein; 1556: Extinct; to Nassau-Beilstein
Nassau-Neuweilnau	County	Upp Rhen	WT	1561: Partitioned from Nassau-Weilburg; 1574: Acquired Saarbrücken, Saarwerden and Stauf; 1602: Extinct; to Nassau-Ottweiler
Nassau-Orange; See: Orange-Nassau				
Nassau-Orange-Fulda	County; 1688: Principality	Upp Rhen	PR	1802: Created for William V of Orange-Nassau in Corvey and Fulda; 1803: Acquired Dietkirchen, Dortmund and Weingarten Abbey; 1804: Bandern and St Gerold sold to Austria; 1806: Acquired Orange-Nassau; lost Dietkirchen and Orange-Nassau to Berg; Corvey, Dortmund and Fulda to France; and Weingarten to Württemberg
Nassau Ottonian Line	County	n/a	n/a	1255: Partitioned from Nassau; 1303: Partitioned into Nassau-Siegen, Nassau-Hadamar and Nassau-Dillenburg
Nassau-Ottweiler	County	Upp Rhen	WT	1593: Partitioned from Nassau-Weilburg; 1602: Renamed to Nassau-Saarbrücken; 1659: Partitioned from Nassau-Saarbrücken; 1728: Extinct; to Nassau-Usingen
Nassau-Saarbrücken	County; 1735: Principality	Upp Rhen	WT	1442: Partitioned from Nassau-Weilburg; 1574: Extinct; divided between Nassau-Weilburg (Ottweiler, Homburg, Kirchheim and Lahr-Mahlberg) and Nassau-Neuweilnau (Saarbrücken, Saarwerden and Stauf); 1602: Renamed from Nassau-Ottweiler; 1627: Partitioned into itself, Nassau-Idstein, Nassau-Weilburg and Nassau-Gleiberg; 1635: Under imperial ban 1648: Restored; 1659: Partitioned into Nassau-Ottweiler, itself and Nassau-Usingen; 1723: Extinct; to Nassau-Ottweiler; 1735: Partitioned from Nassau-Usingen; 1795: To France; 1797: Extinct; rights to Nassau-Usingen
Nassau-Schaumburg	County; 1654: Principality	Low Rhen	n/a	1648: Count of Holzappel by marriage 1676: Extinct; to Anhalt-Bernburg-Schaumburg-Hoym
Nassau-Siegen	County; 1707: Principality	Low Rhen	n/a	1303: Partitioned from Nassau Ottonian Line; 1343: Partitioned into Nassau-Dillenburg and Nassau-Beilstein; 1607: Partitioned from Nassau-Dillenburg; 1648: Partitioned into Nassau-Siegen Catholic Line and Nassau-Siegen Calvinist Line; 1707: Reunited by Nassau-Siegen Calvinist Line; 1735: Extinct; divided between Nassau-Dillenburg and Orange-Nassau
Nassau-Siegen Calvinist Line	County; 1664: Principality	Low Rhen	n/a	1648: Partitioned from Nassau-Siegen; 1664: HRE Prince; 1707: Renamed to Nassau-Siegen
Nassau-Siegen Catholic Line	County; 1652: Principality	Low Rhen	n/a	1648: Partitioned from Nassau-Siegen; 1652: HRE Prince; 1707: To Nassau-Siegen Calvinist Line; 1739: Acquired half of Nassau-Dillenburg; 1742: Sold to Orange-Nassau; 1743: Extinct
Nassau-Sonnenberg	County	n/a	n/a	1355: Partitioned from Nassau Walramian Line; 1390: Extinct; to Nassau-Weilburg
Nassau-Usingen	County; 1688: Principality	Upp Rhen	WT	1659: Partitioned from Nassau-Saarbrücken; 1688: HRE Prince; 1735: Partitioned into itself and Nassau-Saarbrücken; 1795: Left bank territories to France; 1803: Compensated with lands from Cologne, Hesse-Cassel, Hesse-Darmstadt, Mainz and the Palatinate; 1806: Formed the Duchy of Nassau
Nassau Walramian Line	County	n/a	n/a	1255: Partitioned from Nassau; 1294: Acquired Weilburg; 1333: Acquired Merenberg by marriage 1355: Partitioned into Nassau-Wiesbaden-Idstein, Nassau-Weilburg and Nassau-Sonnenberg
Nassau-Weilburg	County; 1688: Principality	Upp Rhen	WT	1355: Partitioned from Nassau Walramian Line; 1381: Acquired Saarbrücken-Commercy by marriage 1442: Partitioned into itself and Nassau-Saarbrücken; 1561: Partitioned into itself and Nassau-Neuweilnau; 1574: Acquired half of Nassau-Saarbrücken; 1593: Partitioned into Nassau-Ottweiler, itself and Nassau-Gleiberg; 1597: Extinct; to Nassau-Ottweiler; 1627: Partitioned from Nassau-Saarbrücken; 1635: Under imperial ban 1648: Restored; 1688: HRE Prince; 1737: Bench of Secular Princes; 1806: To the Duchy of Nassau
Nassau-Wiesbaden	County	Upp Rhen	n/a	1370: Partitioned from Nassau-Wiesbaden-Idstein; 1386: Extinct; to Nassau-Idstein; 1480: Partitioned from Nassau-Wiesbaden-Idstein; 1509: Renamed to Nassau-Wiesbaden-Idstein
Nassau-Wiesbaden-Idstein	County	Upp Rhen	n/a	1355: Partitioned from Nassau Walramian Line; 1370: Partitioned into Nassau-Wiesbaden and Nassau-Idstein; 1386: Reunited by Nassau-Idstein; 1480: Partitioned into Nassau-Wiesbaden and Nassau-Idstein; 1509: Reunited by Nassau-Wiesbaden; 1605: Extinct; to Nassau-Saarbrücken
Naumburg; See: Baumburg	Raugraviate			
Naumburg-Zeitz	Bishopric	Upp Sax	EC	968: Established at Zeitz; 1029: Relocated to Naumburg; 1564: To Saxony; abolished
Naugard	County	n/a	n/a	1078: To Eberstein-Naugard as fief of the Bishopric of Kammin; 1534: To Pomerania-Wolgast
Neckargemünd	Imperial City	n/a	n/a	1286: Imperial Free City; 1395: To the Palatinate
Neipperg	Lordship; 1726: County	Swab	SC	1241: First mentioned; a branch of Schwaigern that was a fief of the Bishopric of Würzburg; 1364: Acquired Schwaigern as fief of the Palatinate; 1434: Acquired Adelshofen as fief of Württemberg; 1520: Partitioned into Neipperg-Adelshofen and Neipperg-Schwaigern; 1726: Renamed from Neipperg-Schwaigern; 1766: Bench of Counts of Swabia; 1806: To Württemberg
Neipperg-Adelshofen	Lordship	n/a	n/a	1520: Partitioned from Neipperg; 1708: Extinct; to Neipperg-Schwaigern
Neipperg-Klingenberg	Lordship	n/a	n/a	1652: Partitioned from Neipperg-Schwaigern; 1672: Extinct; to Neipperg-Schwaigern
Neipperg-Streichenberg	Lordship	n/a	n/a	1581: Partitioned from Neipperg-Schwaigern; 1649: Extinct; to Neipperg-Schwaigern
Neipperg-Schwaigern	Lordship; 1672: Barony	n/a	n/a	1520: Partitioned from Neipperg; 1581: Partitioned into itself and Neipperg-Streichenberg; 1652: Partitioned into Neipperg-Klingenberg and itself 1672: HRE Baron; 1726: HRE Count; renamed to Neipperg
Nellenburg	County; 1401: Landgraviate	n/a	n/a	958: First mentioned; branch of the Eberhardinger; 1105: Partitioned into itself and Mörsberg; 1170: Extinct; to Veringen; 1216-22: Partitioned from Veringen; 12??: Acquired Stockach; 1401: Acquired Hegau and Madach; 1422: Extinct; to Tengen; 1465: Sold to Austria; attached to Further Austria; 1805: To Württemberg; 1810: Parts to Baden
Neresheim (St Ulrich and St Afra in Neresheim)	Abbacy	Swab	SP	1095: Formed; 1764: Imperial immediacy 1803: To Thurn and Taxis; 1806: To Bavaria; 1810: To Württemberg
Nesselrode (Nesselrath)	Lordship	n/a	n/a	1303: First mentioned as a vassal of Deutz Abbey; 1335: Vassal of Guelders; 1368: Vassal of Berg; 1396: Acquired Ehreshoven; 1429: Acquired Herten; 1436: Acquired Herrnstein (Stein); 1477: Partitioned into Nesselrode-Stein, Nesselrode-Ehrenstein and Nesselrode-Ereshoven; 1508: Acquired Hugenpoet; 1511: Acquired Ketteler
Nesselrode-Ehrenstein	Lordship	n/a	n/a	1477: Partitioned from Nesselrode; 1524: Extinct; to Rennenberg; 1574: To Loe-Wissen; 1582: To Nesselrode-Stein
Nesselrode-Ereshoven	Lordship; 1653: Barony; 1705: County	n/a	n/a	1477: Partitioned from Nesselrode; 1500: Acquired Palsterkamp; 1511: Partitioned into Nesselrode-Palsterkamp and itself 1653: HRE Baron; 1705: HRE Count; 1806: Mediatised
Nesselrode-Herten	Lordship	n/a	n/a	1569: Partitioned from Nesselrode-Stein; 1589: Extinct; to Nesselrode-Stein
Nesselrode-Hugenpoet	Lordship; 1653: Barony	n/a	n/a	1508: Created when John of Nesselrode acquired Hugenpoet; fief of Cleves; 1653: HRE Baron
Nesselrode-Landskron	Barony; 1710: County	Low Rhen	WE	1708: Renamed from Nesselrode-Rhade; 1710: HRE Count; 1776: Acquired Reichenstein; 1806: To Berg and Nassau
Nesselrode-Palsterkamp	Lordship; 1653: Barony; 1705: County	n/a	n/a	1511: Partitioned from Nesselrode-Ereshoven; 1533: Extinct; to Loe von Wissem
Nesselrode-Reichenstein	Barony; 1702: HRE County	Low Rhen	WE	1698: Renamed from Nesselrode-Reichenstein after purchase of Reichenstein; 1702: HRE County; Lower Rhenish-Westphalian Circle and Bench of Counts of Westphalia; 1776: Extinct; to Nesselrode-Landskron
Nesselrode-Rhade (Nesselrode-Rath, Nesselrode-Rheydt)	Lordship; 1652: Barony	n/a	n/a	1569: Partitioned from Nesselrode-Stein; 1585: Extinct; divided between Nesselrode-Herten and Nesselrode-Stein; 1624: Partitioned from Nesselrode-Stein; 1652: HRE Baron; 1696: Acquired Landskron; 1708: Renamed to Nesselrode-Landskron
Nesselrode-Stein	Lordship; 1652: Barony	n/a	n/a	1477: Partitioned from Nesselrode; 1478: Acquired Rhade; 1582: Acquired Ehrenstein; 1569: Partitioned into Nesselrode-Herten, itself and Nesselrode-Rhade; 1615: Acquired Lüttinghof; 1624: Partitioned into itself and Nesselrode-Rhade; 1652: HRE Baron; 1698: Acquired Reichenstein; renamed to Nesselrode-Reichenstein
Neubruchhausen	County	n/a	n/a	1234: Partitioned from Bruchhausen; 1384: To Hoya; 1388: Extinct
Neuburg	County	n/a	n/a	c. 1050: First mentioned; to Formbach-Neuburg; 1158: To Andechs-Meran; 1248: To Bavaria; 1283: To Austria; 1463: To Rohrbach; 1469: To Ortenburg; 1473: To Austria; 1497: To Bavaria-Landshut; 1503: To Bavaria; 1507: To Austria; 1514: To Canissa as fief of Austria; 1528: To Salm-Neuburg as fief of Austria; 1654: To Sinzendorf as fief of Austria; 1680: To Austria; 1698: To Hamilton as fief of Austria; 1719: To Lamberg-Sprinzenstein as fief of Austria; 1730: To the Bishopric of Passau as fief of Austria; 1803: To Bavaria; 1815: Divided between Austria and Bavaria
Neuchâtel (Neuchatel, Neuenburg); Sovereign Prince and Count of Neuchâtel and Count of Valangin	County; 1643: Principality	n/a	n/a	1032: First mentioned as belonging to the Kingdom of Burgundy; 1034: To Fenis; Counts of Neuchâtel; 1218: Partitioned into Neuchâtel German Line and Neuchâtel Romance Line; 1288: Romance line extinct; given to Chalon-Arly who took the name Neuchâtel; 1373: Extinct in male line 1375: Acquired Neuchâtel-Nidau by marriage 1395: Extinct; to Freiburg; 1444: To Hachberg-Sausenberg; 1503: Extinct in male line 1504: To Orléans-Longueville by marriage 1643: HRE Prince; 1648: Left the empire as ally of the Swiss Confederation; 1707: In personal union with Prussia; 1806: To France; 1814: In personal union with Prussia; 1815: Joined Switzerland
Neuchâtel-Aarberg	County	n/a	n/a	1225: Partitioned from Neuchâtel German Line; 1276: Partitioned into Neuchâtel-Aarberg-Aarberg and Neuchâtel-Aarberg-Valangin
Neuchâtel-Aarberg-Aarberg	County	n/a	n/a	1276: Partitioned from Neuchâtel-Aarberg; 1367: Sold Aarberg to Neuchâtel-Nidau; then extinct in male line 1377: Rest sold to de la Tour-Châtillon
Neuchâtel-Aarberg-Valangin	County	n/a	n/a	1276: Partitioned from Neuchâtel-Aarberg; 1407: Sold Willisau to Lucerne; 1450: Imperial immediacy 1517: Extinct; to Challant
Neuchâtel German Line (Deutsch-Neuchâtel)	County	n/a	n/a	1218: Partitioned from Neuchâtel; 1225: Partitioned into Neuchâtel-Nidau, Neuchâtel-Strassberg and Neuchâtel-Aarberg
Neuchâtel-Nidau	County	n/a	n/a	1225: Partitioned from Neuchâtel German Line; 1375: Extinct; to Neuchâtel by marriage
Neuchâtel Romance Line (Welsch-Neuchâtel)	County	n/a	n/a	1218: Partitioned from Neuchâtel; 1288: Extinct; to Chalon-Arly who took the name Neuchâtel
Neuchâtel-Strassberg	County	n/a	n/a	1225: Partitioned from Neuchâtel German Line; 1327: Sold Balm to Neuchâtel-Nidau c. 1360: Rest sold to Neuchâtel-Nidau; 1364: Extinct
Neuenahr	County	n/a	n/a	1225: Partitioned from Are-Nürburg (Nürburg); 1276: Partitioned into Neuenahr-Neuenahr and Neuenahr-Rösberg; 1419: Annexed to Virneburg; 1545: To Julich
Neuenahr-Alpen	County	El Rhin	WE	1465: Partitioned from Neuenahr-Rösberg; 1542: Acquired Limburg; 1589: Extinct in male line; divided between itself, Limburg and Neuenahr-Bedburg; 1602: Acquired Limburg; 1610: Extinct; to Bentheim-Tecklenburg-Rheda
Neuenahr-Bedburg	County	El Rhin	WE	1465: Partitioned from Neuenahr-Rösberg; 1519: Acquired Moers; 1578: Extinct; to Neuenahr-Alpen; 1589: Partitioned from Neuenahr-Alpen; 1600: Extinct; to Orange-Nassau
Neuenahr-Neuenahr	County	n/a	n/a	1276: Partitioned from Neuenahr; 1358: Extinct in male line; succession dispute between Neuenahr-Rösberg and Saffenburg; 1371: To Saffenburg-Neuenahr; 1382: Made fief of the Archbishopric of Cologne; 1424: To Virneburg-Saffenburg as fief of the Archbishopric of Cologne; 1546: To Jülich
Neuenahr-Rösberg	County	n/a	n/a	1276: Partitioned from Neuenahr; 1465: Partitioned into itself, Neuenahr-Alpen and Neuenahr-Bedburg; 1484: Extinct; to Neuenahr-Bedburg
Neuenbaumburg (Neuenbaumberg)	Raugraviate	n/a	n/a	1253: Partitioned from Baumburg; 1338: Half sold to Mainz; 1457: Extinct; rest to Mainz
Neuenburg am Rhein	Imperial City	n/a	n/a	1219: Imperial Free City; Formerly a territory of Zähringen; 1311: To Austria; attached to Further Austria
Neumark	Margraviate	n/a	n/a	1252: Brandenburg and Magdeburg purchased the Lubusz Land; The Neumark was gradually expanded eastwards through acquisitions from Poland and the Teutonic Order; 1402: Sold to the Teutonic Order; 1463: Sold to Brandenburg; 1535: To Brandenburg-Küstrin; 1571: To Brandenburg
Nickenich	Lordship	n/a	n/a	1163: First mention of the Knights of Nickenich; 1376: Acquired Weiherhofe as fief of the Archbishopric of Cologne; 1440: Lost Weiherhofe; 1444: Enfeoffed to the Archbishopric of Trier; 1546: To Leyen-Saffig as fief of the Archbishopric of Trier; 1611: To Leyen-Nickenich as fief of the Archbishopric of Trier; 1714: To Leyen-Hohengeroldseck as fief of the Archbishopric of Trier; 1795: To France; 1815: To Prussia
Nidda	County	n/a	n/a	c. 1065: Volkold I of Malsburg enfeoffed with Bingenheim by Fulda Abbey; assumed the name Nidda; 1187: Most of Nidda given to the Order of St John; 1191: Extinct; to Ziegenhain as fief of Fulda Abbey; 1234: Imperial immediacy in the City of Nidda; 1258: Partitioned from Ziegenhain; 1333: Extinct; to Ziegenhain
Nidwalden	Imperial Valley	n/a	n/a	To Lenzburg; 1173: To Habsburg; 1291: With Obwalden became a founding member of the Swiss League; 1324: Imperial immediacy 1648: Left Empire as member of Swiss Confederation
Nieder-Isenburg; See: Lower Isenburg				
Niedermünster in Regensburg	Abbacy	Bav	RP	788? 1002: Imperial immediacy 1803: To the Archbishopric of Regensburg
Niedersalm; See: Salm in the Ardennes	County			
Nienburg	County	n/a	n/a	1215: Acquired by Hoya; 1345: To Hoya and Bruchhausen, commonly called Nienburg; 1582: To Brunswick-Calenberg
Nienburg	Abbacy	n/a	n/a	970: Formed; 10th Century: Imperial immediacy 1166: To the Archbishopric of Magdeburg; 1593: To Anhalt; 1680: Suppressed
Nomény; See: Lorraine-Nomény				
Nordgau; See: Lower Alsace				
Nordgau	Margraviate	n/a	n/a	Originally a gau county of Bavaria between Neuburg and Regensburg; 939: Separated from Bavaria and invested to Schweinfurt; 1004: Temporal authority given to the Bishopric of Bamberg; 1060: By 1060 extended to the Main and the Egerland c. 1073: Invested to Vohburg; 1255: To Bavaria; 1329: To the Palatinate; henceforth known as Upper Palatinate
Nordhausen	Imperial City	Low Sax	RH	1220: Imperial Free City; 1802: To Prussia; 1807: To Westphalia; 1813: To Prussia
Nördlingen	Imperial City	Swab	SW	1215: Imperial Free City; 1802: To Bavaria
Nordmark (Northern March)	Margraviate	n/a	n/a	965: Partitioned from Marca Geronis; 983: Abandoned in the Great Wendish Rebellion; 1134: Reestablished; 1150: Inherited Brandenburg; henceforth known as the Margraviate of Brandenburg
Northeim	County	n/a	n/a	c. 950: First mentioned 1144: Extinct; to Saxony
Northern March; See: Nordmark				
Nostitz-Rieneck (Nostiz-Rieneck)	County	Franc	FR	1673: Line established when John Hartwig of Nostitz-Rokitnitz purchased Rieneck; 1803: Rieneck sold to Colloredo-Mansfeld
Nürburg	County	n/a	n/a	1144: Partitioned from Are (Are-Nürburg); 1218: Partitioned into itself and Neuenahr; 1290: Extinct; to the Archbishopric of Cologne
Nuremberg	Burgraviate; 1363: Princely Burgraviate	n/a	n/a	1105: Established for Raab; 1192: Extinct; to Zollern; 1218: Partitioned from Zollern; 1248: Acquired Bayreuth; 1331: Acquired Ansbach; 1340: Acquired Kulmbach and Plassenburg; 1363: HRE Princely Burgrave; 1417: Acquired and henceforth known as the Electorate of Brandenburg; 1427: Burgraviate sold to city 1440: Partitioned into Brandenburg-Ansbach and Brandenburg-Bayreuth
Nuremberg	Imperial City	Franc	SW	1219: Free Imperial City; 1427: Acquired Castle of Nuremberg; 1505: Gained territory after Landshut War of Succession; 1806: To Bavaria
