= List of states in the Holy Roman Empire (A) =

This is a list of states in the Holy Roman Empire beginning with the letter A. Some historians mark the beginning of the Empire as 800, with the coronation of Frankish king Charlemagne ("Charles the Great").

Name	Type	Imperial circle	Imperial diet	History
Aachen	Free Imperial City	Low Rhen	RH	1166: Free Imperial City; 1794: To France; 1815: to Prussia
Aalen	Free Imperial City	Swab	SW	1241: Founded by Hohenstaufen by 1340: To Oettingen; 1359: Sold to Württemberg; 1360: Free Imperial City; 1500: To Swabian Circle; 1802: To Duchy of Württemberg
Aalst	County	—N/a	—N/a	964: First mentioned 1056: Extinct; to Flanders despite Brabantian claims to the territory
Abensberg-Traun (Apensberg-Traun)	Lordship; 1653: County	Swab	SW	1114: First mentioned; ministerialis of Austria; 1653: HRE Count; 1656: Joined the Swabian Circle (personalist); 1662: Acquired Eglofs; joined the Bench of Counts of Swabia; 1804: Sold Eglofs to Windisch-Graetz Elder Line
Achalm	County	—N/a	—N/a	1040: First mentioned; brother of Urach; 1098: Extinct; to Urach; 1250: To Fürstenberg
Ahr; See: Are	County (9th century) Imperial Immediacy 1107:	[data missing]	[data missing]	First mentioned 992: as part of the Carolingian Empire 1107: Achieved Imperial Immediacy 1144:County divided into Are-Are, Are-nürburg, Are-hochstaden 1246: Annexed by Cologne
Ahrgau	County	—N/a	—N/a	Originally a gau county of the Carolingian Empire; See: Are; 1107: Separated from Prüm Abbey; 1246: Annexed to the Archbishopric of Cologne
Albeck (Alpeck)	Lordship	—N/a	—N/a	1081: First mentioned; ministerialis of Swabia; 1245: To Burgau; 1289: To Werdenberg-Sargans; 1312: To Werdenberg-Trochtelfingen; 1349: To Werdenberg-Alpeck; 1383: Sold to Ulm
Aldenburg; HRE Count of Aldenburg, Lord of the Free Lordship of Knyphausen, Noble Lord of Varel	Lordship; 1651: Barony; 1667: County	—N/a	—N/a	1646: Anton, illegitimate child of Anthony Günther of Oldenburg, ennobled 1651: HRE Baron; 1667: Acquired Knyphausen and Varel; HRE Count; 1738: Extinct; to Bentinck by marriage
All Saints (Allerheiligen; in Schaffhausen)	Abbacy	Swab	SP	1049: Abbey established 1080: Acquired Schaffhausen c. 1122: Acquired Hiltensweiler; 1190: Schaffhausen independent 1529: To Schaffhausen; monastery suppressed
Alsace	County; 1130: Landgraviate	—N/a	—N/a	1125: Partitioned from County of Saarbrücken; 1130: HRE Landgrave; 1189: Also known as Counts of Werd c. 1340: Sold to Oettingen; 1359: Sold to Strasbourg
Alsace and Burgundy	Bailiwick	None	SW	1212: Bailiwick of the Teutonic Order; 1805: Divided between Baden and Württemberg
Altbruchhausen	County	—N/a	—N/a	1234: Partitioned from Bruchhausen; 1335: To Tecklenburg; 1338: Sold to Hoya; 1354: Extinct
Altena-Berg (Altena-Marck; Altena-Mark)	County	—N/a	—N/a	1180: Partitioned from Berg-Altena; 1226: Renamed to Mark
Altena-Isenberg	County	—N/a	—N/a	1180: Partitioned from Berg-Altena; 1126: Lands given to Altena-Berg (Mark); 1243: Restored to a small part of the former county 1253: Renamed to Isenberg-Limburg
Altenbaumburg (Altenbaumberg)	Raugraviate	—N/a	—N/a	1253: Partitioned from Baumburg; 1366: Most sold to the Palatinate; 1385: Extinct; remainder to the Palatinate
Altensteig	Lordship	—N/a	—N/a	1100: First mentioned; to Knights of Altensteig; 1280: To Hohenberg-Nagold; 1318: To Hohenberg-Wildberg; 1355: To Hohenberg-Altensteig; 1398: Sold to Baden; 1603: Sold to Württemberg
An der Etsch (on the Adige)	Bailiwick	Aust	—N/a	1269: Bailiwick of the Teutonic Order; 1805: To Bavaria; attached to the Tyrol; 1814: To Austria
Andechs (Andechs-Meran from 1180)	County; 1180: Duchy	—N/a	—N/a	1132: Renamed from Diessen; 1157: Acquired Wolfratshausen; 1173: Acquired Istria; 1180: Acquired Merania; 1208: Most possessions in Bavaria and the Tyrol to Bavaria; 1211: Acquired the County Palatine of Burgundy; 1248: Extinct; County Palatine of Burgundy to Hugh of Chalon; remainder to Bavaria
Andlau	Abbey	—N/a	—N/a	1681: To France
Anhalt	Lordship; 1212: County; 1218: Princely County; 1250: Principality	Upp Sax	PR	1173: Independence from Saxony; 1212: HRE Count; 1218: HRE Princely Count; 1250: HRE Prince; 1252: Partitioned into Anhalt-Aschersleben, Anhalt-Bernburg and Anhalt-Köthen; 1570: Reunited by Anhalt-Roßlau; 1603: Partitioned into Anhalt-Dessau, Anhalt-Bernburg, Anhalt-Köthen, Anhalt-Plötzkau and Anhalt-Zerbst
Anhalt-Aschersleben	Principality	—N/a	—N/a	1252: Partitioned from Anhalt; 1315: Extinct; Succession dispute between Anhalt-Bernburg and the Bishopric of Halberstadt; 1322: To the Bishopric of Halberstadt
Anhalt-Bernburg	Principality	Upp Sax	PR	1252: Partitioned from Anhalt; 1468: Extinct; divided between Anhalt-Köthen and Anhalt-Zerbst; 1603: Partitioned from Anhalt; 1630: Partitioned into itself and Anhalt-Harzgerode; 1707: Partitioned into itself and Anhalt-Zeitz-Hoym
Anhalt-Bernburg-Schaumburg-Hoym	Principality	Low Rhen	WE	1727: Created from union of Anhalt-Zeitz-Hoym with Holzapfel; 1806: Holzapfel to Nassau; 1812: Extinct; to Anhalt-Dessau
Anhalt-Dessau	Principality	Upp Sax	PR	1474: Partitioned from Anhalt-Zerbst; 1551: Partitioned into Anhalt-Zerbst, Anhalt-Roßlau and itself 1570: Extinct; to Anhalt-Roßlau; 1603: Partitioned from Anhalt
Anhalt-Dornburg	Principality	—N/a	—N/a	1667: Appanage created in Anhalt-Zerbst; 1742: Extinct; appanage abolished
Anhalt-Harzgerode	Principality	Upp Sax	PR	1630: Partitioned from Anhalt-Bernburg; 1709: Extinct; to Anhalt-Bernburg
Anhalt-Köthen	Principality	Upp Sax	PR	1252: Partitioned from Anhalt; 1396: Partitioned into itself and Anhalt-Zerbst; 1562: Extinct; to Anhalt-Dessau; 1603: Partitioned from Anhalt; 1665: Inherited by Anhalt-Plötzkau; 1765: Appanage Anhalt-Köthen-Pless established
Anhalt-Köthen-Pless	Principality	—N/a	—N/a	1765: Appanage line created in Anhalt-Köthen; 1767: Official investiture of Pless by Prussia
Anhalt-Mühlingen	Principality	—N/a	—N/a	1667: Appanage created in Anhalt-Zerbst; 1714: Extinct; appanage abolished
Anhalt-Plötzkau	Principality	Upp Sax	PR	1603: Partitioned from Anhalt; 1665: Inherited and renamed to Anhalt-Köthen
Anhalt-Roßlau	Principality	Upp Sax	PR	1551: Partitioned from Anhalt-Dessau; 1570: Renamed to Anhalt
Anhalt-Zeitz-Hoym	Principality	Upp Sax	—N/a	1718: Partitioned from Anhalt-Bernburg; 1727: Renamed to Anhalt-Bernburg-Schaumburg-Hoym
Anhalt-Zerbst	Principality	Upp Sax	PR	1396: Partitioned from Anhalt-Köthen; 1474: Partitioned into itself and Anhalt-Dessau; 1562: Extinct; to Anhalt-Dessau; 1603: Partitioned from Anhalt; 1667: Appanages Anhalt-Mühlingen and Anhalt-Dornburg created 1796: Extinct; to Anhalt-Dessau
Anholt	Lordship; 1621: County	Low Rhen	WF	1169: Fief of Utrecht; 1234: To Zuylen-Anholt as fief of Utrecht betw. 1317-1343: Imperial immediacy 1399: To Gemen; 1402: To Bronchhorst-Batenburg; 1621: HRE Count; 1641: to Salm-Salm; 1653: Joined the Westphalian Counts; 1810: To France; 1815: To Prussia
Antwerp	Margraviate	Burg	—N/a	974: Established; 994: Acquired Toxandria; 1106: United with Lower Lorraine; 1190: Title to Brabant
Aosta	County; 1310: HRE Duchy	—N/a	—N/a	c. 999: To the Bishopric of Aosta; fief of the Kingdom of Arles; 1026: To Savoy; 1310: HRE Duke; 1539: To France; 1563: Restored to Savoy; 1810: To France; 1814: Restored to Piedmont-Sardinia
Appenzell	Canton	—N/a	—N/a	11th Century: To St Gall's Abbey; 1408: Independence from St Gall's Abbey; 1513: Member of the Old Swiss Confederacy; 1597: Partitioned into Appenzell Innerrhoden and Appenzell Ausserrhoden
Appenzell Ausserrhoden (Appenzell Outer Rhodes)	Canton	—N/a	—N/a	1597: Partitioned from Appenzell; 1648: Left the Empire as part of Switzerland
Appenzell Innerrhoden (Appenzell Inner Rhodes)	Canton	—N/a	—N/a	1597: Partitioned from Appenzell; 1648: Left the Empire as part of Switzerland
Are (Ahr)	County	—N/a	—N/a	992: First mentioned in the Ahrgau; 1107: Imperial immediacy 1144: Partitioned into Are-Are, Are-Nürburg and Are-Hochstaden
Are-Are (Are, Ahr)	County	—N/a	—N/a	1144: Partitioned from Are; 1210: Extinct; to Are-Nürburg
Are-Nürburg (Nürburg)	County	—N/a	—N/a	1144: Partitioned from Are; 1225: Partitioned into itself and Neuenahr; 1290: Extinct; to the Archbishopric of Cologne
Are-Hochstaden (Hochstaden)	County	—N/a	—N/a	1144: Partitioned from Are; 1149: Acquired Hochstaden by marriage 1162: Partitioned into itself and Are-Wickrath; 1246: To the Archbishopric of Cologne; 1265: Extinct
Are-Wickrath (Wickrath, Wickenrode)	County	—N/a	—N/a	1162: Partitioned from Are-Hochstaden; 1301: Extinct; to Guelders
Arenberg (Aremberg)	Duchy	El Rhin	PR	c. 1177 c. 1177: Lords of Arenberg first mentioned; burgraves of Cologne within the Archbishopric of Cologne; 1220: Partitioned into itself and Wildenburg; 1279: Sold burgraviate to the Archbishops; 1299: Lords of Arenberg extinct; to County of Mark; 1328: To Mark-Arenberg; 1549: Inherited by Ligne which assumed the name 'Arenberg'; 1576: Princely County; 1580: HRE Council of Princes; 1644: Duchy; 1795: Duchy ceded to France; 1803: Obtained Meppen and Vest Recklinghausen; 1810: Mediatised
Arlon	County c. 1167: Margraviate	—N/a	—N/a	950 c. 1167: HRE Margrave; 1214: United with Luxembourg; 1221: To Limburg
Arnsberg	County	—N/a	—N/a	1050: First mentioned; to Werl c. 1070: To Werl-Arnsberg; 1124: Extinct in male line 1132: To Cuijk-Arnsberg by marriage 1368: Sold to Cologne who added it to the Duchy of Westphalia
Arnstein	County	—N/a	—N/a	1131: Branch of Steußlingen established a line at Arnstein; 1211: Side line Lindow-Ruppin established 1226: Partitioned into itself and Barby c. 1294: Given to Falkenstein; 1326: Extinct; 1334: To Regenstein; 1387: Sold to Mansfeld Younger Line
Artois	County	Burg	—N/a	898: To Flanders; 1180: To France; 1237: Artois established as appanage 1350: To the Duchy of Burgundy; 1477: To France; 1483: To the Burgundian Netherlands; 1659: To France
Aschaffenburg	Principality	—N/a	—N/a	10th Century: To Mainz; 1803: Made principality of the Archbishopric of Regensburg; 1806: To the Grand Duchy of Frankfurt; 1814: To Bavaria
Aspremont-Lynden	Barony; 1676: County	Low Rhen	WE	1307: First mentioned 1590: Purchased Rekem (Reckheim); 1623: Imperial Estate; 1676: HRE Count; 1793: To France; 1802: Compensated with Baindt; 1806: To Württemberg
Auersperg	Lordship; 1550: Barony; 1653: County; 1664: Princely County	Aust	PR	1162: First mentioned, in Carniola; 1550: HRE Baron; 1630: HRE Count; 1653: HRE Prince; 1654: Bench of Secular Princes; 1654: Acquired Silesia-Munsterberg and Franckenstein; 1663: Acquired Tengen; 1664: HRE Princely Count; 1791: Acquired Gottschee; 1806: Tengen to Baden
Augsburg	Bishopric	Swab	EC	4th Century: Diocese established 8th Century: First mention of historical mention of diocese c. 888: Imperial immediacy 1276: City of Augsburg acquired independence 1802: To Bavaria
Augsburg	Free Imperial City	Swab	SW	1276: Free Imperial City; 1806: To Bavaria
Austria	1156: Duchy; 1453: Archduchy	Aust	EC	833: Established, part of the Duchy of Bavaria; Margraviate; 976: Separated from Bavaria; 1156: HRE Duke; 1192: Acquired Styria; 1379: Partitioned into itself (Albertine Line) and Inner Austria (Leopoldine Line); 1453: HRE Archduke; 1457: Inherited by Inner Austria (Leopoldine Line); 1804: Assumed rank of Empire
Austria	Bailiwick	Aust	—N/a	1260: Bailiwick of the Teutonic Order; 1805: To Austria
