= Siege of Haguenau (1705) =

Conflict in War of the Spanish Succession

Siege of Hagenau (1705)
- Part of the War of the Spanish Succession
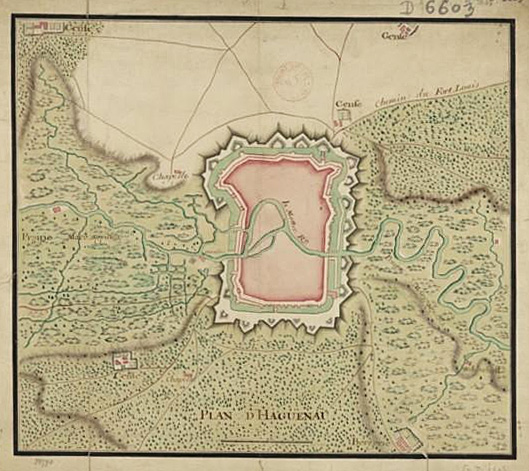
- Map of Haguenau's fortifications in 1700
Date	27 September to 5 October 1705
Location	Haguenau, Alsace, France
Result	Imperial victory

Belligerents
Holy Roman Empire	France

Commanders and leaders
(Holy Roman Empire) Johann von Thüngen	(Kingdom of France) Brigadier de Péry (Kingdom of France) Colonel de Harly

Strength
16,000 men, 33 guns	2,600 men 26 artillery pieces

Casualties and losses
Unknown	Unknown

The siege of Haguenau took place from 27 September to 5 October 1705 during the War of the Spanish Succession. An Imperial army under Johann Karl von Thüngen captured the French town of Haguenau in Alsace.

== Background ==
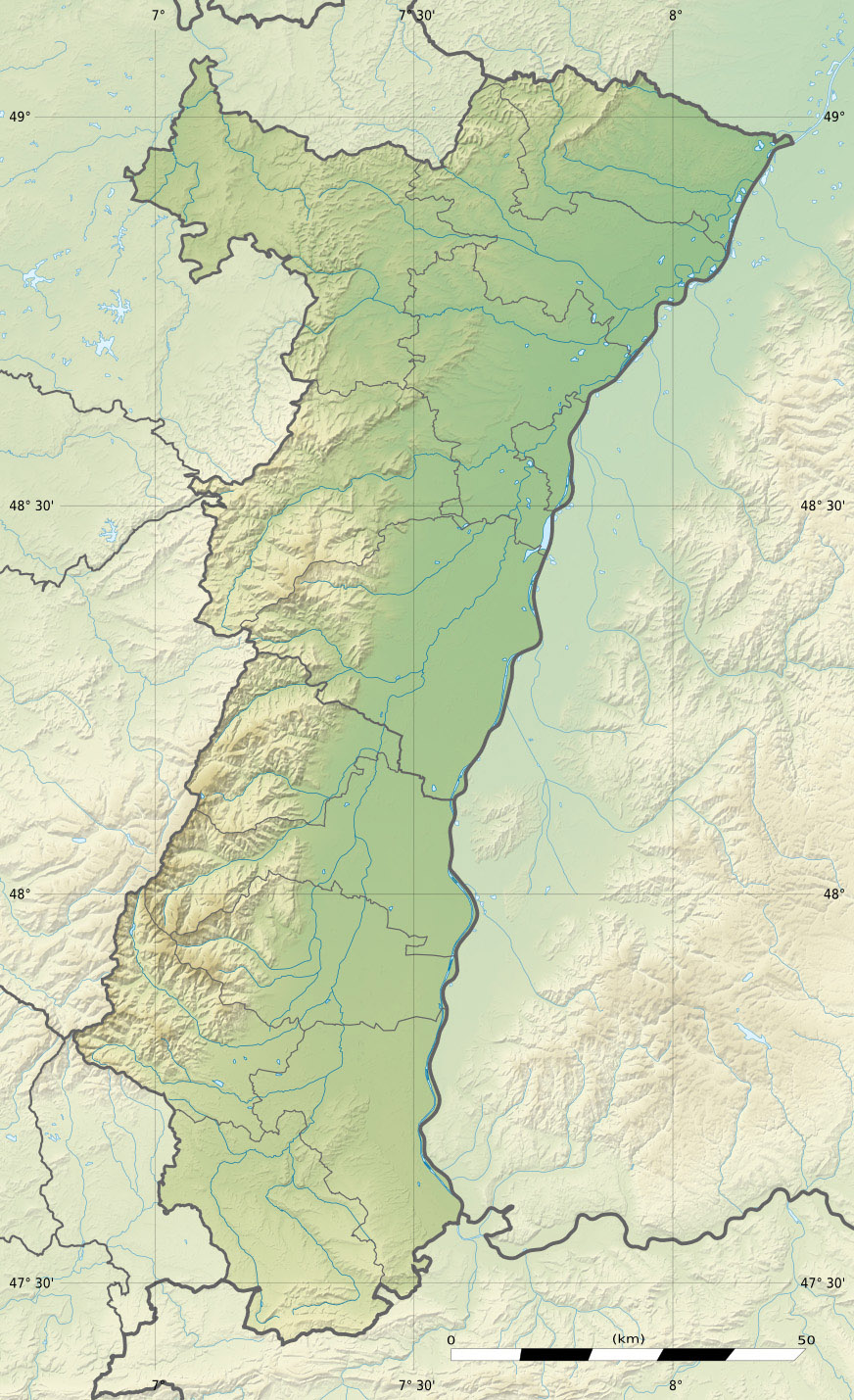
Alsace, key locations in text;
Note: the River Rhine forms the modern border between Alsace (left, dark green) and Germany (right, light green)

While the main Allied army under the Duke of Marlborough was operating against French in the Spanish Netherlands, a French army under Marshal Claude de Villars in Alsace captured Wissembourg in early July and attempted to dislodge the Imperials from their position near Lauterbourg; but the attempt was beaten off by the Imperial Field Marshal Johann Karl von Thüngen who had taken over from the ill Louis William, Margrave of Baden-Baden.

A French detachment captured Homburg on 27 July, the Palatinate garrison agreeing to retire to Mannheim. On 28 August, the Imperial forces, now commanded by the Margrave of Baden and reinforced by 16,000 Prussian and Palatinate troops in 10 Prussian infantry battalions and 20 cavalry squadrons, breached the Lines of Haguenau, a French line of field fortifications, advanced into Lower Alsace and laid siege, first to Drusenheim and then to Haguenau on 27 September, the latter falling on 5 October. After a slender resistance, the French garrison offered to surrender with conditions but was rebuffed by Thüngen, who demanded their imprisonment. Leaving 400 men and the sick and wounded inside to distract the Allies, the French governor de Péry escaped Haguenau under the cover of night toward Saverne with some 2,000 of his troops, the incomplete Imperial investment of 20 squadrons of Prussian and Württemberger infantry failing to stop them. The 400-strong detachment escaped soon after. Louis of Baden was outraged by this failure. The sieges concluded the campaign season, the opposing armies withdrawing to winter quarters later that month. The Imperials had established a bridgehead across the Rhine.
