= Rudolf Holzapfel =

Notable people named Rudolf Holzapfel include:

- Rudolf Maria Holzapfel (1874–1930), a Polish-Austrian psychologist and philosopher
- Rudolf Melander Holzapfel (1900–1982), a Shakespeareean scholar and art dealer
- Rudi Holzapfel (1938–2005), an Irish poet and teacher; son of Rudolf Melander

== See also ==
- Holzapfel
- Rudolph (name)
