= Bailiwick =

Area of jurisdiction of a bailiff

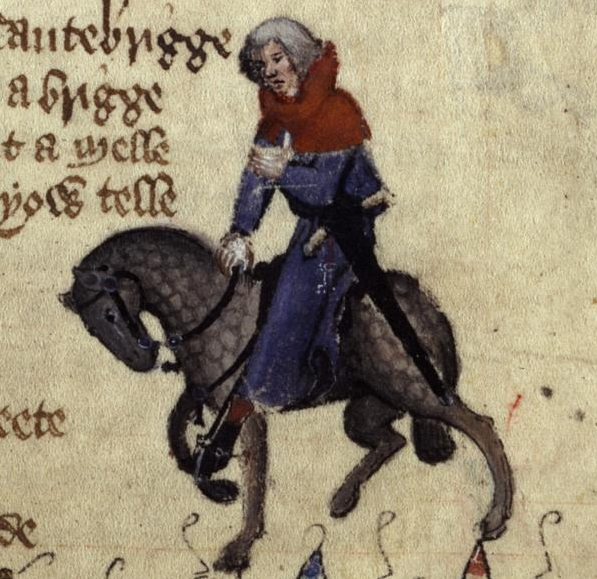
Oswald the Reeve in "The Reeve's Tale" by Geoffrey Chaucer

A bailiwick (/ˈbeɪlɪwɪk/) is usually the area of jurisdiction of a bailiff, and once also applied to territories in which a privately appointed bailiff exercised the sheriff's functions under a royal or imperial writ.

In English, the original French bailie combined with -wic, the Anglo-Saxon suffix (meaning a village) to produce a term meaning literally 'bailiff's village'—the original geographic scope of a bailiwick. In the 19th century, it was absorbed into American English as a metaphor for a sphere of knowledge or activity.

The term can also be used colloquially to mean 'one's area of expertise.'

The term survives in administrative usage in the British Crown Dependencies of the Channel Islands, which are grouped for administrative purposes into two bailiwicks – the Bailiwick of Jersey (comprising the island of Jersey and uninhabited islets such as the Minquiers and Écréhous) and the Bailiwick of Guernsey (comprising the islands of Guernsey, Sark, Alderney, Brecqhou, Herm, Jethou and Lihou). A Bailiff heads each Channel Island bailiwick.

A bailiwick (German: Ballei) was also the territorial division of the Teutonic Order. Here, various Komtur(en) formed a Ballei province.

== Origin ==
The term originated in France (bailie being the Old French term for a bailiff). Under the ancien régime in France, the bailli was the king's representative in a bailliage, charged with the application of justice and control of the administration. In southern France, the term generally used was sénéchal (cf seneschal) who held office in the sénéchaussée. The administrative network of baillages was established in the 13th century, based on the earlier medieval fiscal and tax divisions (the 'baillie') which had been used by earlier sovereign princes. (For more on this French judicial system, see bailli, prévôt and Early Modern France.)

== Bailiwick of Bicester Market End ==
At Bicester in Oxfordshire, the Lord of the Manor of Market End was the Earl of Derby who, in 1597, sold a 9,999-year lease to 31 principal tenants. This in effect gave the manorial rights to the leaseholders, 'purchased for the benefit of those inhabitants or others who might hereafter obtain parts of the demesne'. The leaseholders elected a bailiff to receive the profits from the bailiwick, mainly from the administration of the market and distribute them to the shareholders. From the bailiff's title, the arrangement became known as the Bailiwick of Bicester Market End. By 1752 all of the original leases were in the hands of ten men, who leased the bailiwick control of the market to two local tradesmen.

== List of Bailiwicks ==
- Bailiwick of Guernsey
- Bailiwick of Jersey
- Bailiwick of Brandenburg
- Bailiwick of Ennerdale
- Bailiwick of Franconia
- Bailiwick of Koblenz
- Bailiwick of Bois le Duc
- Bailiwick of Stade
- Twescard
- Bailiwick of Utrecht
- Bailiwick An Der Etsch
- Common bailiwicks in Switzerland
- Bailiwick of Alsace and Burgundy
