= Schwaigern =

Town in Germany

- Town
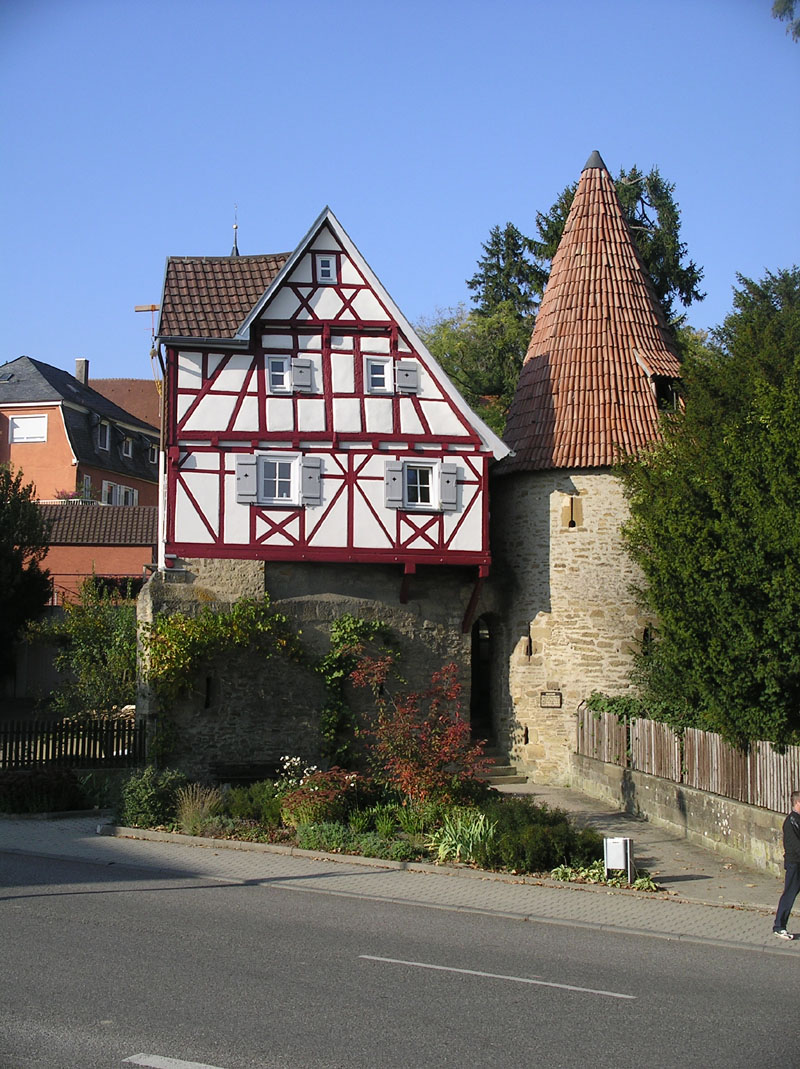
- A Witches' Tower in the town

- Coat of arms

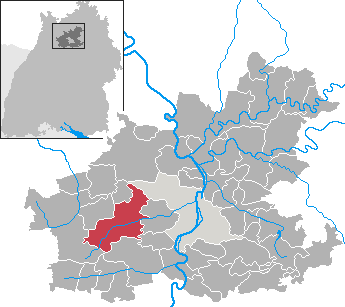
- Location of Schwaigern within Heilbronn district
- Interactive map of Schwaigern
- Location within Germany Location within Baden-Württemberg
- Coordinates: 49°8′N 9°3′E
- Country: Germany
- State: Baden-Württemberg
- Admin. region: Stuttgart
- District: Heilbronn
- Subdivisions: Kernstadt und 3 Stadtteile

Government
  - Mayor (2022–30): Sabine Rotermund

Area
  - Total: 49.50 km^{2} (19.11 sq mi)
- Elevation: 189 m (620 ft)

Population (2025-12-31)
  - Total: 11,784
  - Density: 238.1/km^{2} (616.6/sq mi)
- Time zone: UTC+01:00 (CET)
  - Summer (DST): UTC+02:00 (CEST)
- Postal codes: 74193
- Dialling codes: 07138
- Vehicle registration: HN
- Website: schwaigern.de

Schwaigern (German: [ˈʃvaɪɡɐn]) is a town in the district of Heilbronn, Baden-Württemberg, Germany. It is situated 12 km west of Heilbronn.

== Geography ==
=== Neighbouring municipalities ===
The neighbouring towns and municipalities of Schwaigern (clockwise) are: Leingarten, Nordheim (Württemberg), Brackenheim, Eppingen, Gemmingen and Massenbachhausen (all in the district of Heilbronn).

=== Town structure ===
Schwaigern consists of Schwaigern itself and its districts Massenbach, Stetten am Heuchelberg and Niederhofen. Schwaigern has approximately 11,000 inhabitants.

== History ==
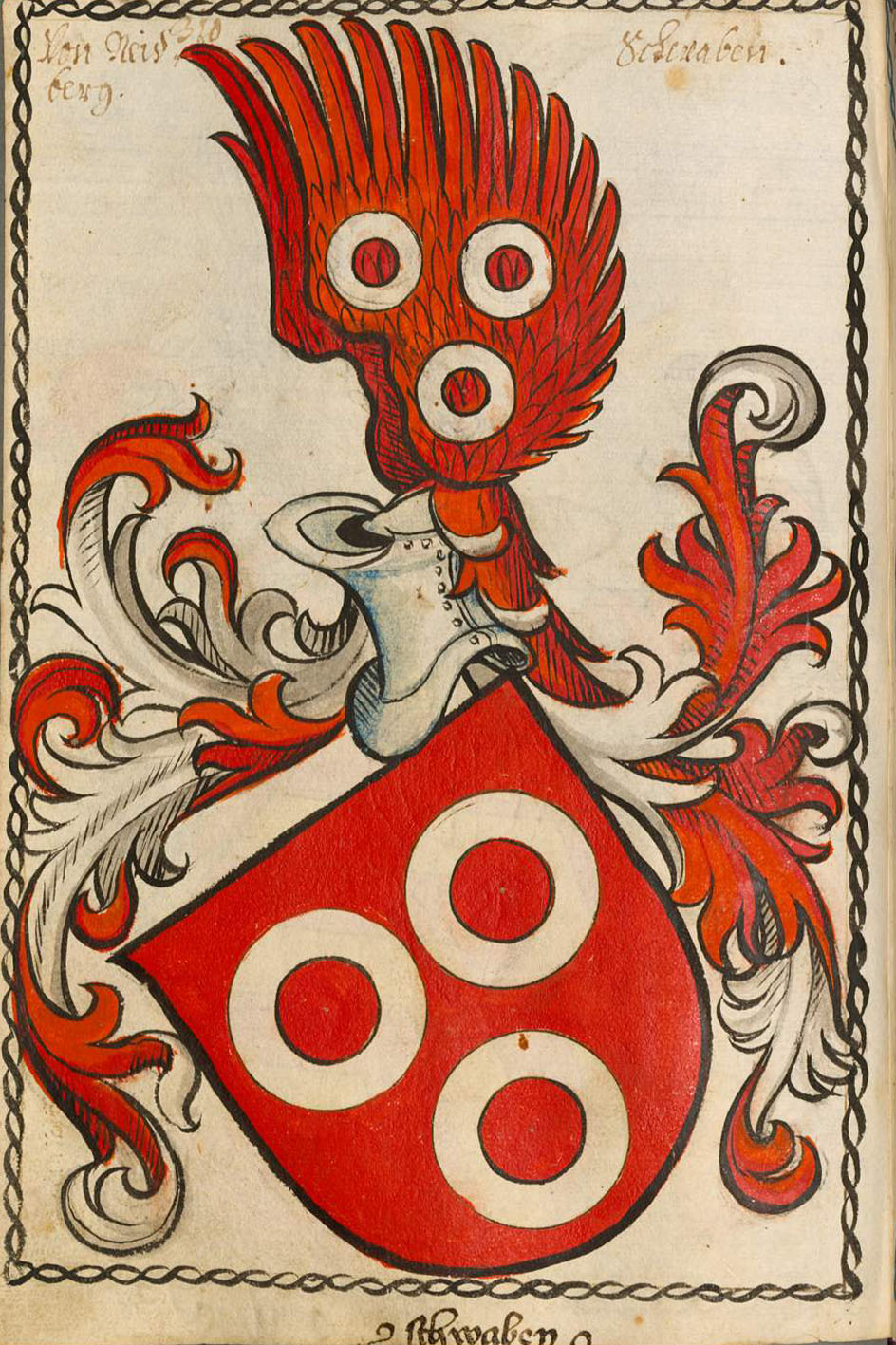
Neipperg family coat of arms

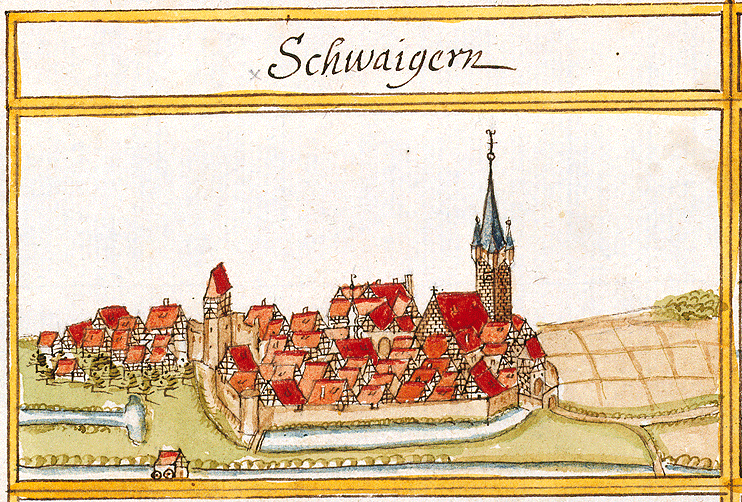
Schwaigern, Andreas Kieser

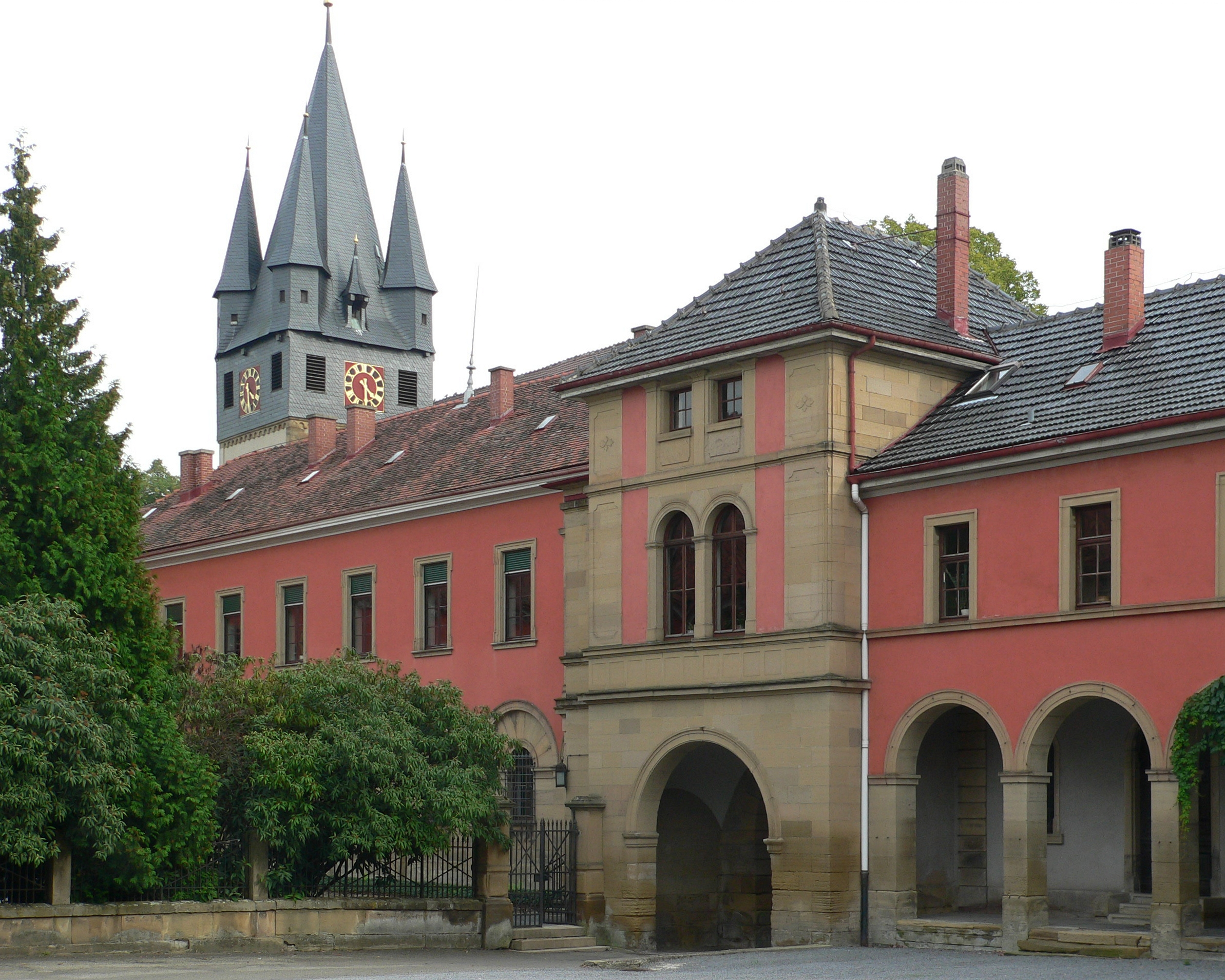
Schwaigern Castle of 1839 with church in the background

Finds of the Neolithic era and during the Roman period show an early settlement of this area. The town was first mentioned in writing in the Lorsch codex of 766. Bertilo, Lord of Schwaigern, is first mentioned in 1120. The construction of a church is proved in the 13th century. Bertilo's descendants took on the name "Lords of Neipperg" in 1241, after their castle of Neipperg near Brackenheim. In 1407 they also acquired the Lordship of Klingenberg near Heilbronn. In 1702, Schwaigern became the residence of the Lords of Neipperg, who were elevated to the rank of counts in 1726. In 1766, the County of Neipperg became an Imperial State of the Holy Roman Empire, mediatised to the Kingdom of Württemberg in 1806. The last ruling count, Adam Albert von Neipperg, married Napoleon's widow Marie Louise.

The village received the right to hold a market in 1486. After 1630 the Black Death killed a large proportion of the inhabitants. In 1690, during the War of the Grand Alliance, the then Schwaigern Castle was burned down. In 1806, the town came to Württemberg by mediatization and Reichsdeputationshauptschluss. The castle was rebuilt until 1839 and is still today owned by the comital family of Neipperg. Several fires destroyed large areas of the medieval town centre in the 19th and 20th centuries. In 1971/1972 Massenbach, Stetten am Heuchelberg and Niederhofen were incorporated.

=== Religions ===
The Lords of Neipperg became Protestants around 1530. Therefore, each of Schwaigern, Stetten am Heuchelberg and Niederhofen is a Protestant parish. Massenbach and Massenbachhausen have a common Protestant parish. In 1717, Wilhelm Reinhard von Neipperg, the first count and an Imperial field marshal in the Habsburg service, returned to the Catholic Church. The Catholic parish St. Martinus Schwaigern is responsible for Schwaigern, Stetten, Niederhofen and Neipperg (part of Brackenheim). The Catholic parish St. Kilian Massenbachhausen is responsible for Massenbachhausen and Massenbach. Also the New Apostolic Church has a parish in Schwaigern.

The Young People's Society of Christian Endeavour has local groups in Schwaigern, Stetten and Niederhofen. In Massenbach there is a local group of the YMCA.

=== Districts ===
- Massenbach:

Massenbach was first mentioned in writing in 773. In the Thirty Years' War the castle was destroyed and rebuilt in 1760.

- Stetten am Heuchelberg:

Stetten was mentioned in 1140 and came to Württemberg in 1571.

- Niederhofen:

Niederhofen is the youngest district, since it was first mentioned in 1332. But it already came to Württemberg in 1360.

== Politics ==
=== District council ===
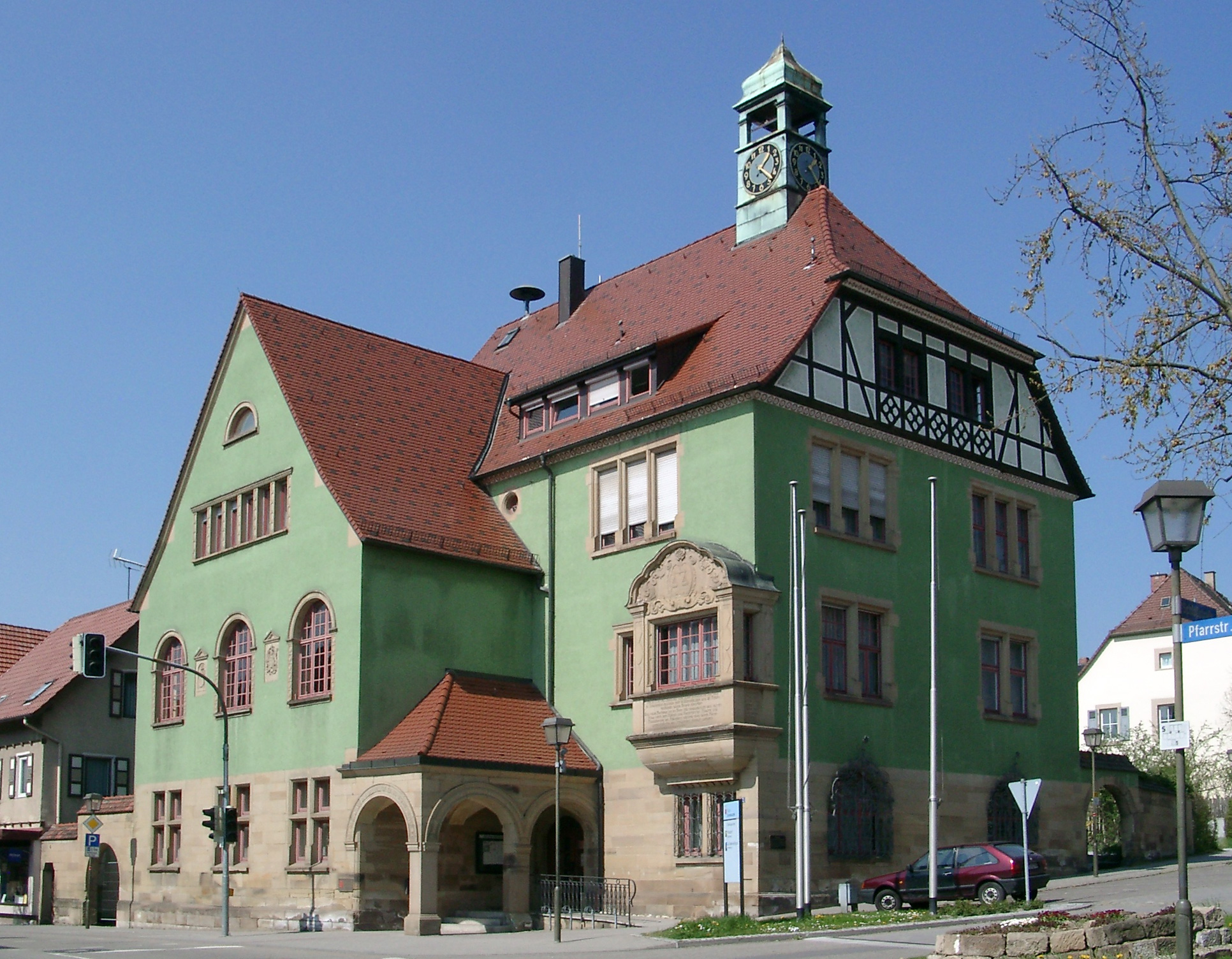
Schwaigern town hall

Schwaigern council has 22 members. The municipal election on 25 May 2014 resulted in the following official results. The council consists of the elected honorary councilors and the mayor as chairman. The mayor is entitled to vote in the municipal council.

Parties and groups		% 2014	seats 2014	% 2009	seats 2009
FWV/BuW	FWV / BuW	34.3	8	35.9	10
CDU	CDU	28.3	6	25.3	7
SPD	SPD	23.9	3	22.9	4
LGU	Green list and independents	13.5	3	15.8	4
Total		100.0	22	100.0	27
Turn-out		51.5 %		54.1 %	

=== Mayors of Schwaigern ===
- Hans Michael Dieter (1724-?)
- Friedrich Benzlen (1826–1868)
- August Liomin (1868–1893)
- Karl Essich (1893–1918)
- Max Neunhoeffer (1919–1933)
- Karl Spingler (1933–1939)
- Fritz Siegele (1941–1945)
- Friedrich Vogt (1945–1954)
- Hellmut Zundel (1954–1963)
- Horst Haug (1963–1999)
- Johannes Hauser (1999–2015)
- Sabine Rotermund (since 2015)

=== Arms ===
Blazon: In red three (2:1) silver rings. Above the sign growing John the Baptist with halo and put on fur, raising the rights, holding a lamb and a cross rod with a flag on his left hand. These arms are provable since 1512. The town colours are red-white.

== Twin towns – sister cities ==
Schwaigern is twinned with:

- Pöndorf, Austria (1988)
- La Teste-de-Buch, France (2004)
- Nottwil, Switzerland (2009)

== Culture and sights ==
=== Museum ===
The Karl-Wagenplast-Museum in the old graveyard chapel shows archaeological exhibitions from the Neolithic to the Middle Ages of the Leintal. It is named after the honorary citizen and archaeologist Karl Wagenplast.

=== Buildings ===
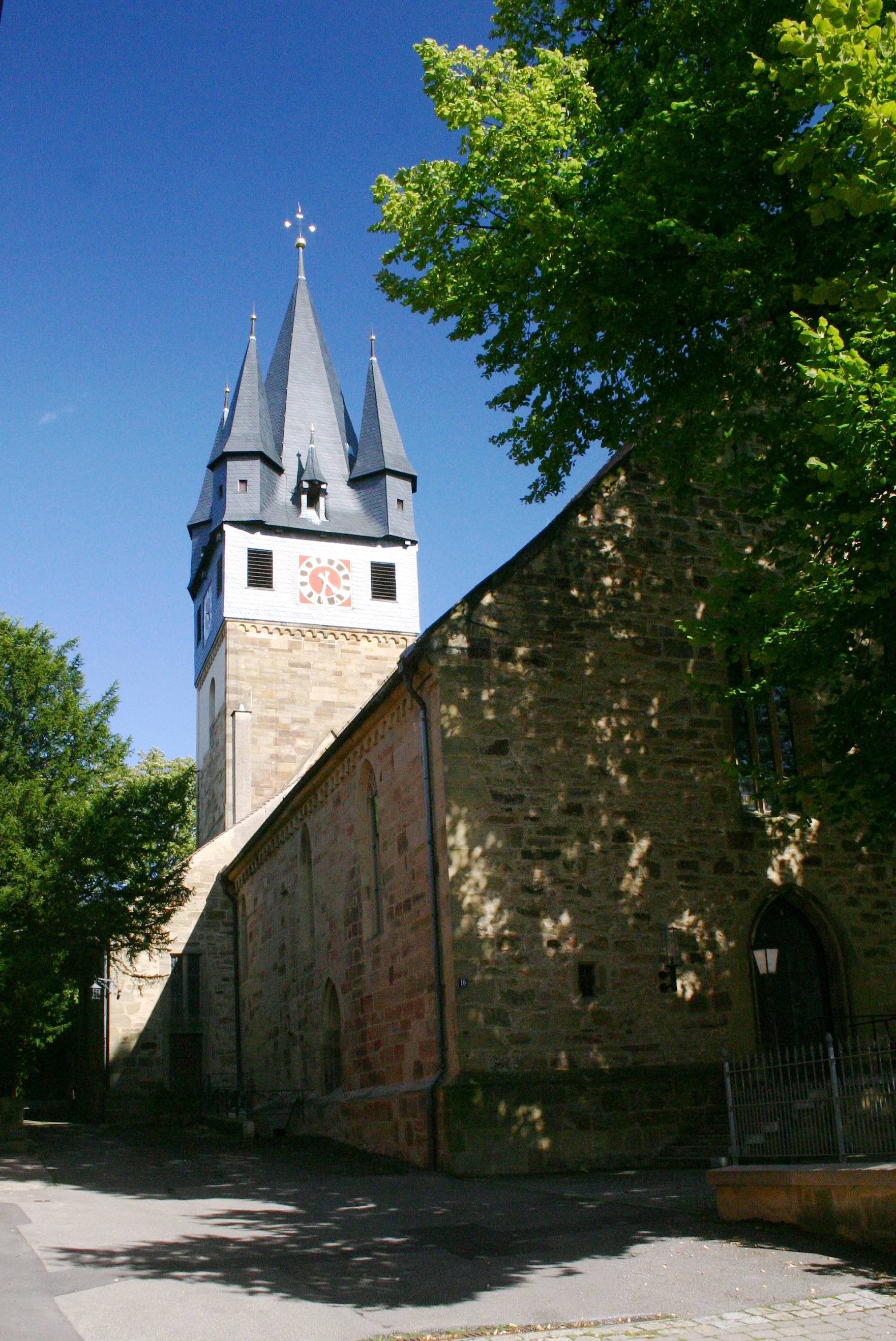
Protestant parish church Schwaigern

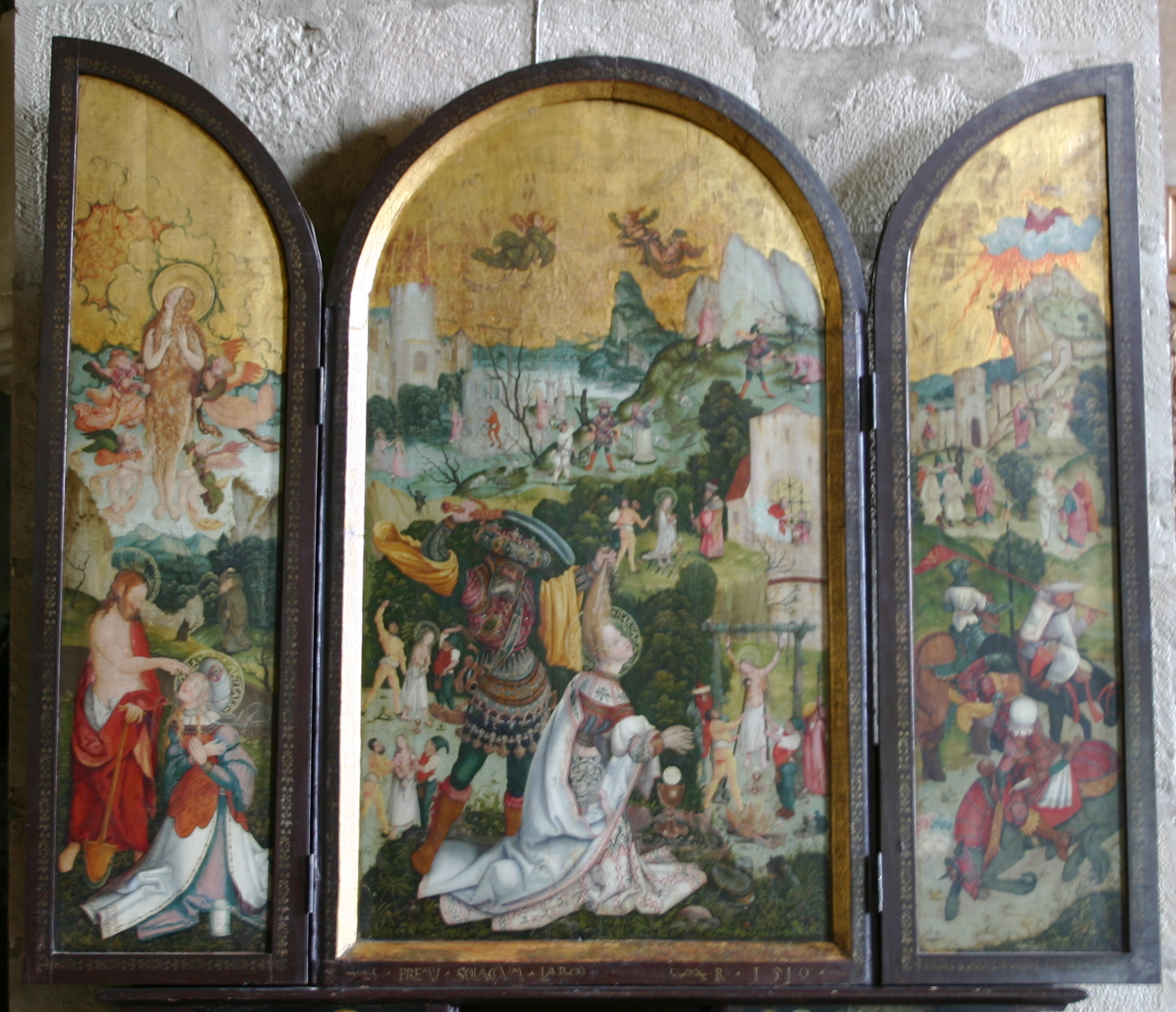
Barbara Altar of Jerg Ratgeb in this church

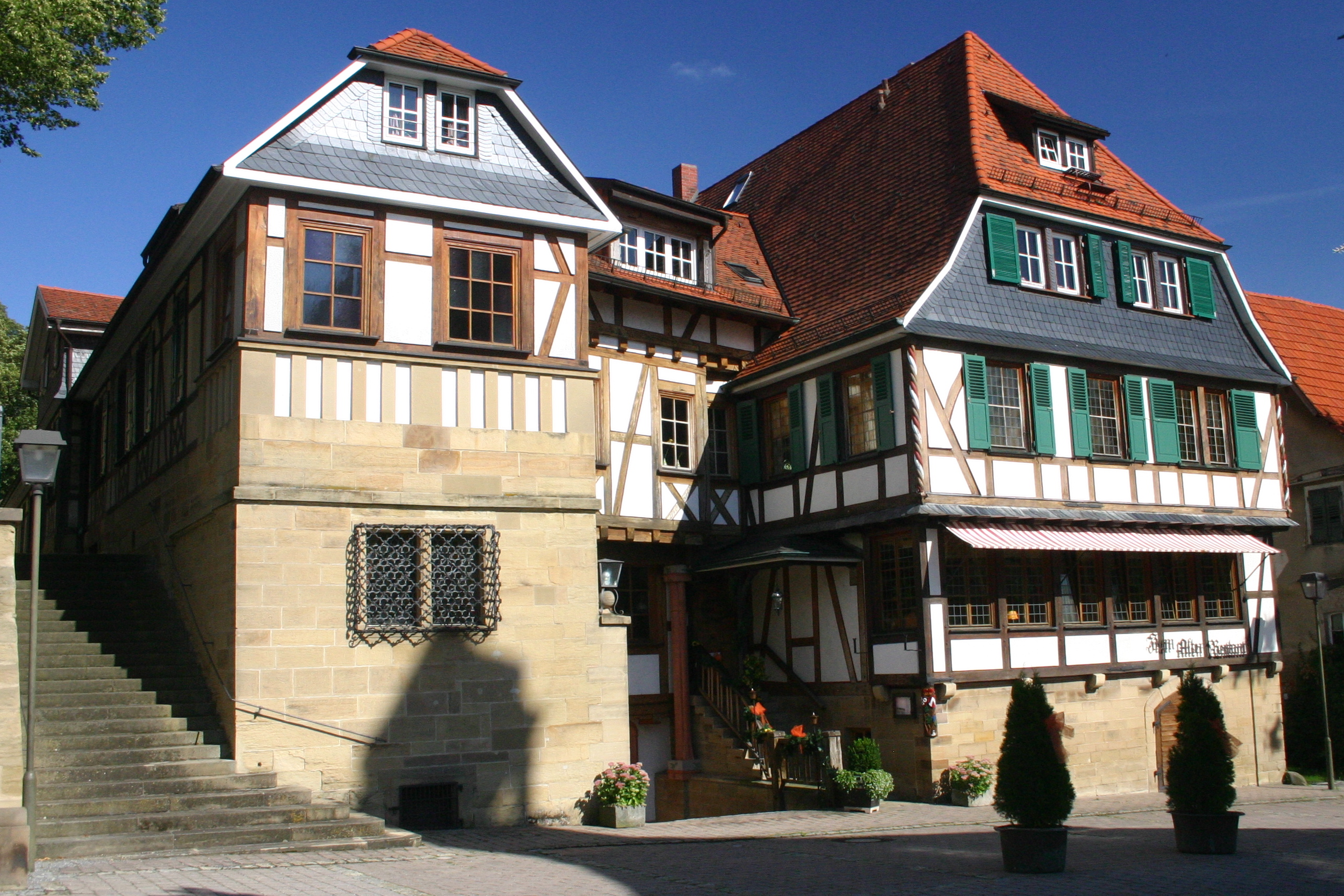
Historic Rentamt in the medieval town

The town church consecrated to John the Baptist goes back to a building of the 13th century and was enlarged by Bernhard Sporer in the early 16th century. Inside there is the Barbara Altar of Jerg Ratgeb. The witch tower on the south-east border of the medieval town was built in 1461. The previous wine-press is a timber framing of 1659. The rococo castle next to the town church was built in 1702, but was rebuilt and enlarged during the 19th century. The town hall was built in 1905/1906 by Ludwig Knortz. Stetten impresses by its parish church of the 15th century as well as its baroque vicarage of 1775. Besides it contains a town hall of the 16th century.

=== Sport and leisure ===
The TSV Schwaigern was founded in 1898 as a gymnastics club. Apart from the traditional gymnastics there are the disciplines of badminton, basketball, chess and the rare discipline wheel gymnastics. In 1992 and 1993, the departments of tennis (TC Schwaigern) and football (FSV Schwaigern) became independent.

In addition, Schwaigern has a heated swimming pool.

In Stetten there are also some clubs. The TSV Stetten founded in 1909 runs football, table tennis, badminton, women gymnastics and child gymnastics. The tennis club of Stetten founded in 1981 as a department of the TSV became independent in 1999. The marksman club Heuchelberg is located next to the Mühlwald, and there is also a golf course in Stetten. With the Leintalzoo Schwaigern has the biggest connected chimpanzee group in Germany.

== Economy and infrastructure ==
The biggest company in Schwaigern is the Walter Söhner GmbH & Co. KG which produces synthetics and has more than 500 employees. Also in Schwaigern and its districts there are some other smaller companies. However, in Stetten and Massenbach the provision of public utility has a downward tendency. For several years up to 2000, Massenbach had no stores.

=== Traffic ===
Schwaigern is situated at the Kraichgau Railway running from Heilbronn to Karlsruhe. Besides the B293 (Heilbronn-Karlsruhe) passes the town. The A6 runs 10 kilometres north of Schwaigern.

=== Education ===
Schwaigern, Massenbach and Stetten each have an elementary school. Also in Schwaigern there is a modern school and a junior high school. The next grammar school is located in Heilbronn.

=== Wine-growing ===
Wine-growing in Schwaigern was first mentioned in 799. The primary sorts of wine are Trollinger, Riesling, Lemberger and Pinot Meunier. The fourth biggest winepress of Baden-Württemberg is located there. The positions of Schwaigern's wine-growing is part of the wine-growing area Württemberg.

== Notable people ==
- Eberhard von Neipperg (1655–1725), Field Marshal of the Holy Roman Empire
- Wilhelm Reinhard von Neipperg (1684-1774), Austrian general
- Adam Albert von Neipperg (1775-1829), Austrian General
- Günther Heinrich Baron von Berg (1765–1843), German jurist and politician
- Erwin von Neipperg (1813–1897), Austrian general

=== Honorary citizens ===
- Karl Wagenplast, native scientist
- Horst Haug, mayor of Schwaigern in 1962–1999

== Gallery ==
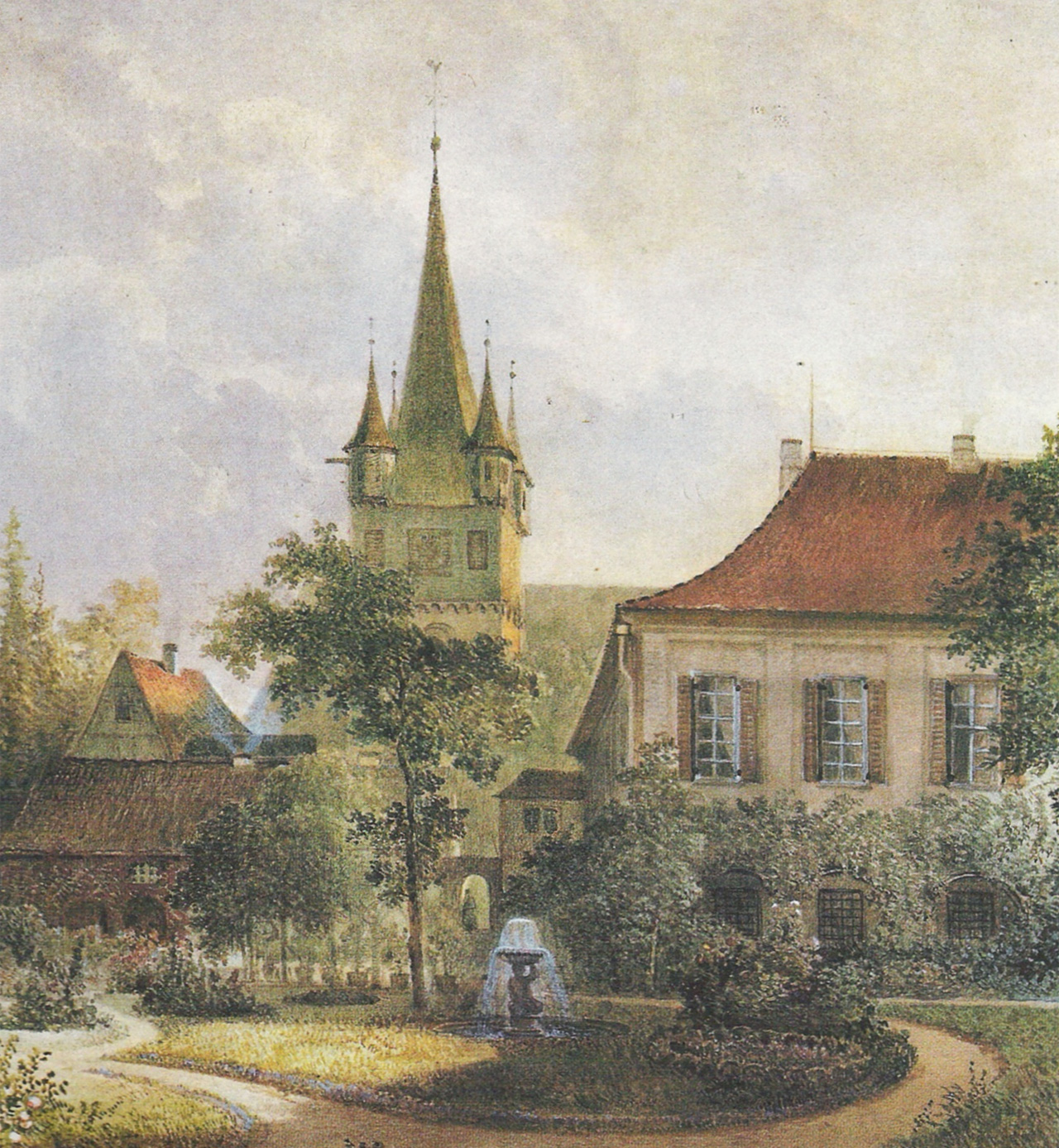
View from the park to its castle and the town church, Pieter Francis Peters, 1851

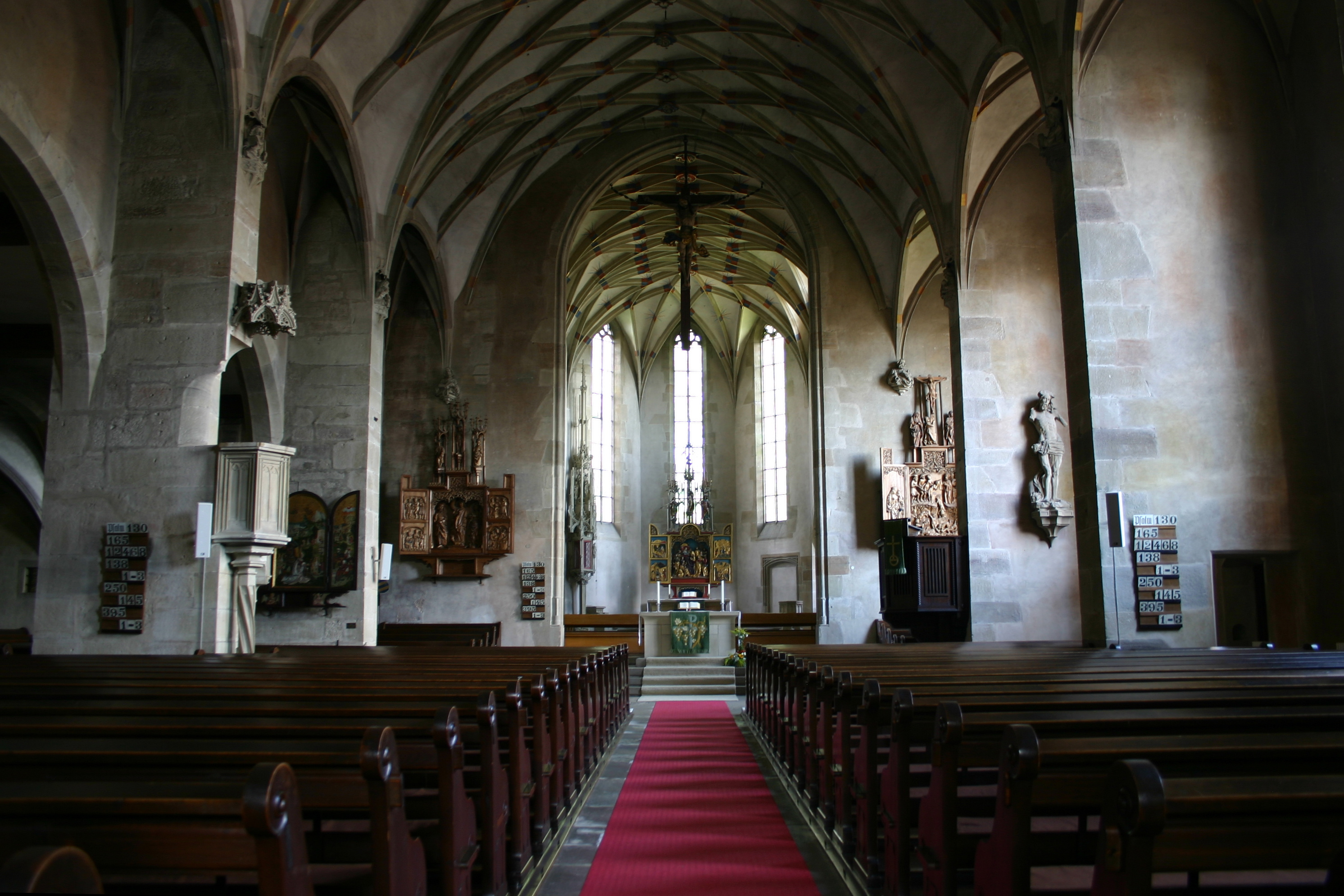
Interior of Protestant parish church

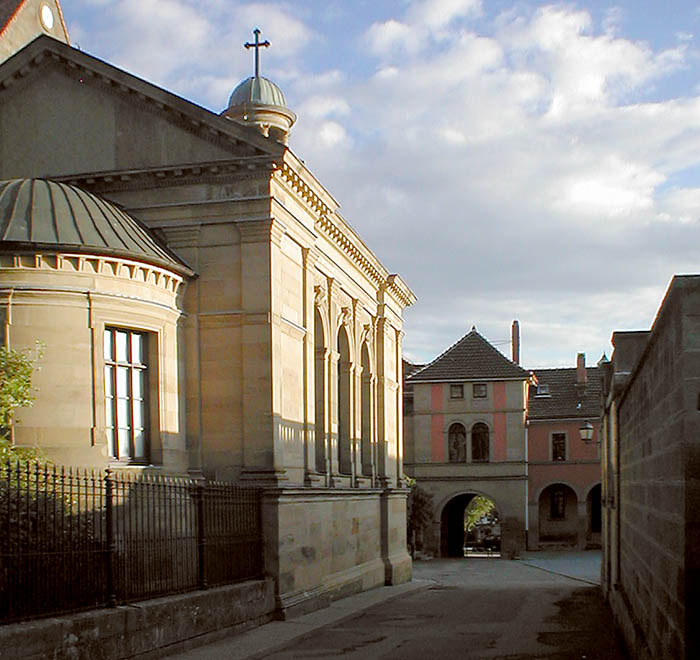
Castle with its chapel

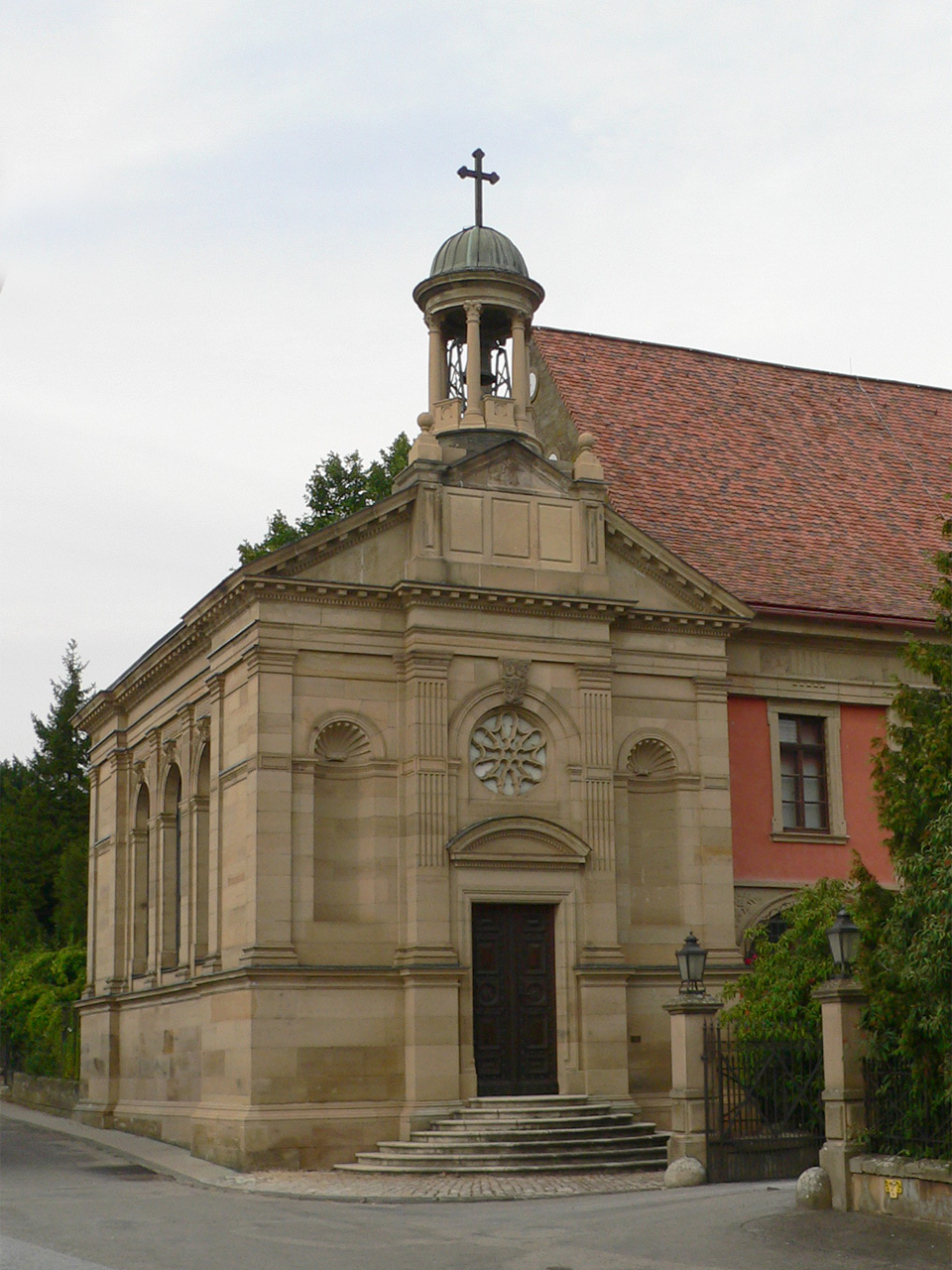
Castle chapel

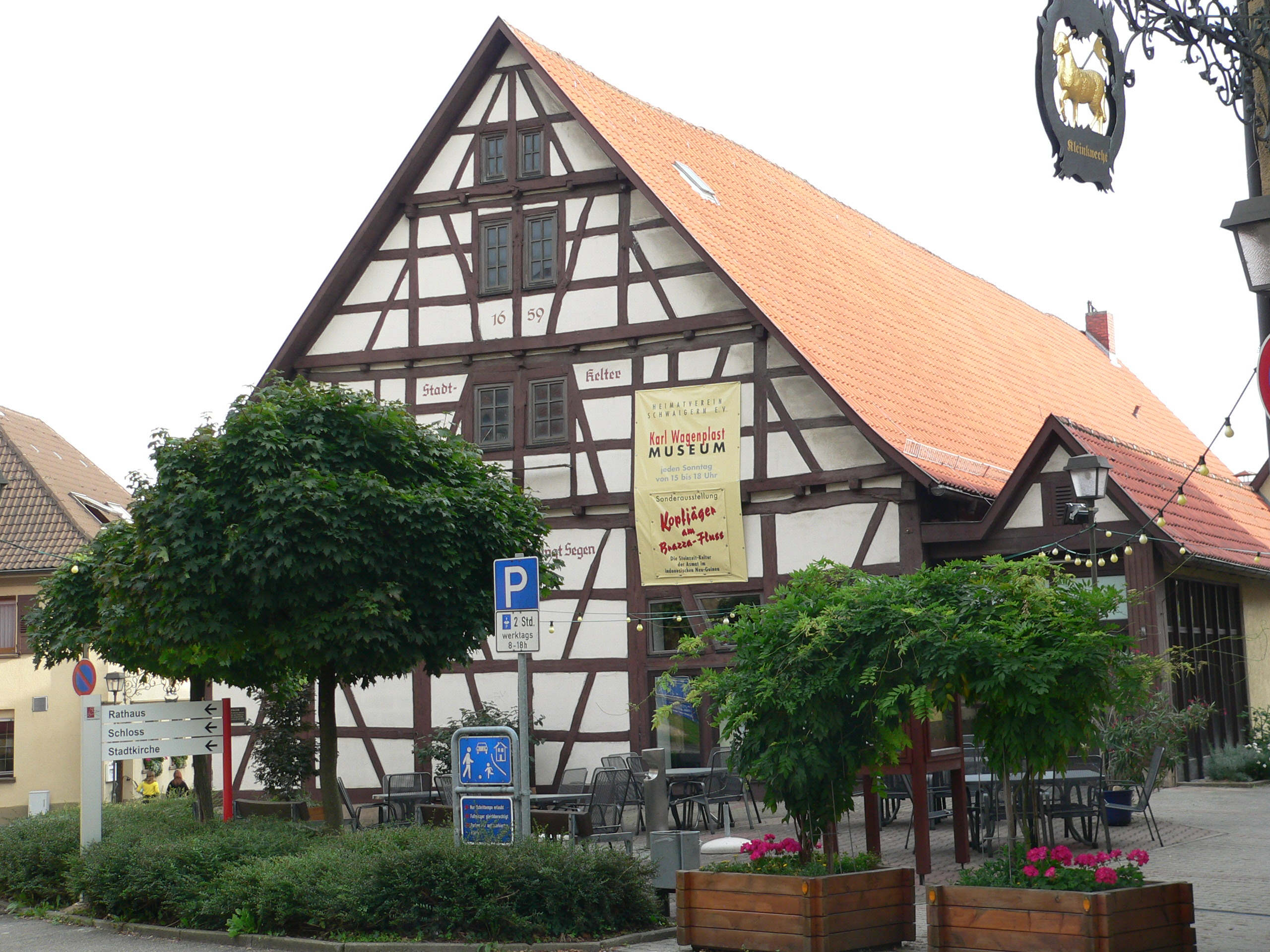
Old wine-press, 1659

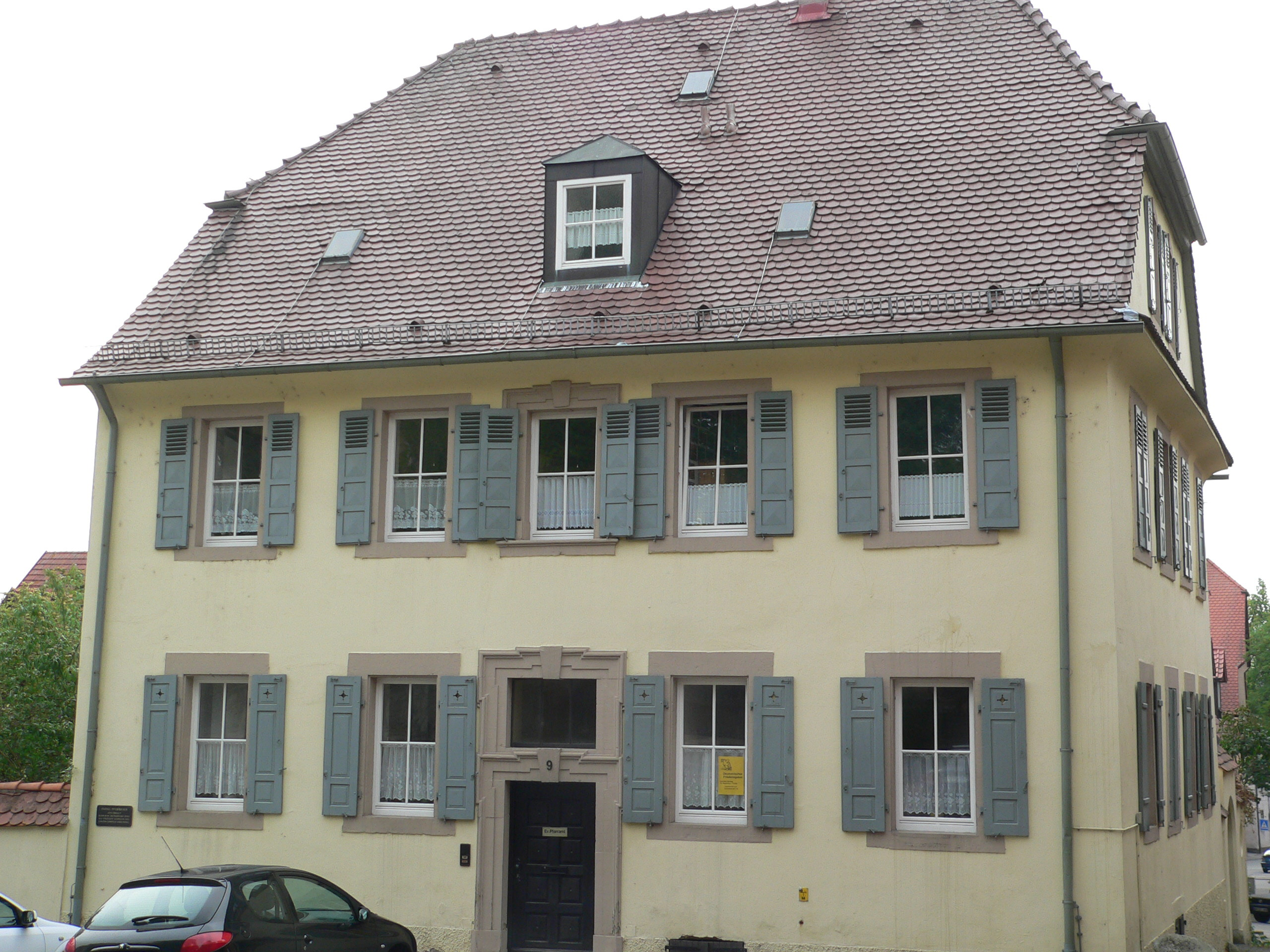
Vicarage, 1776

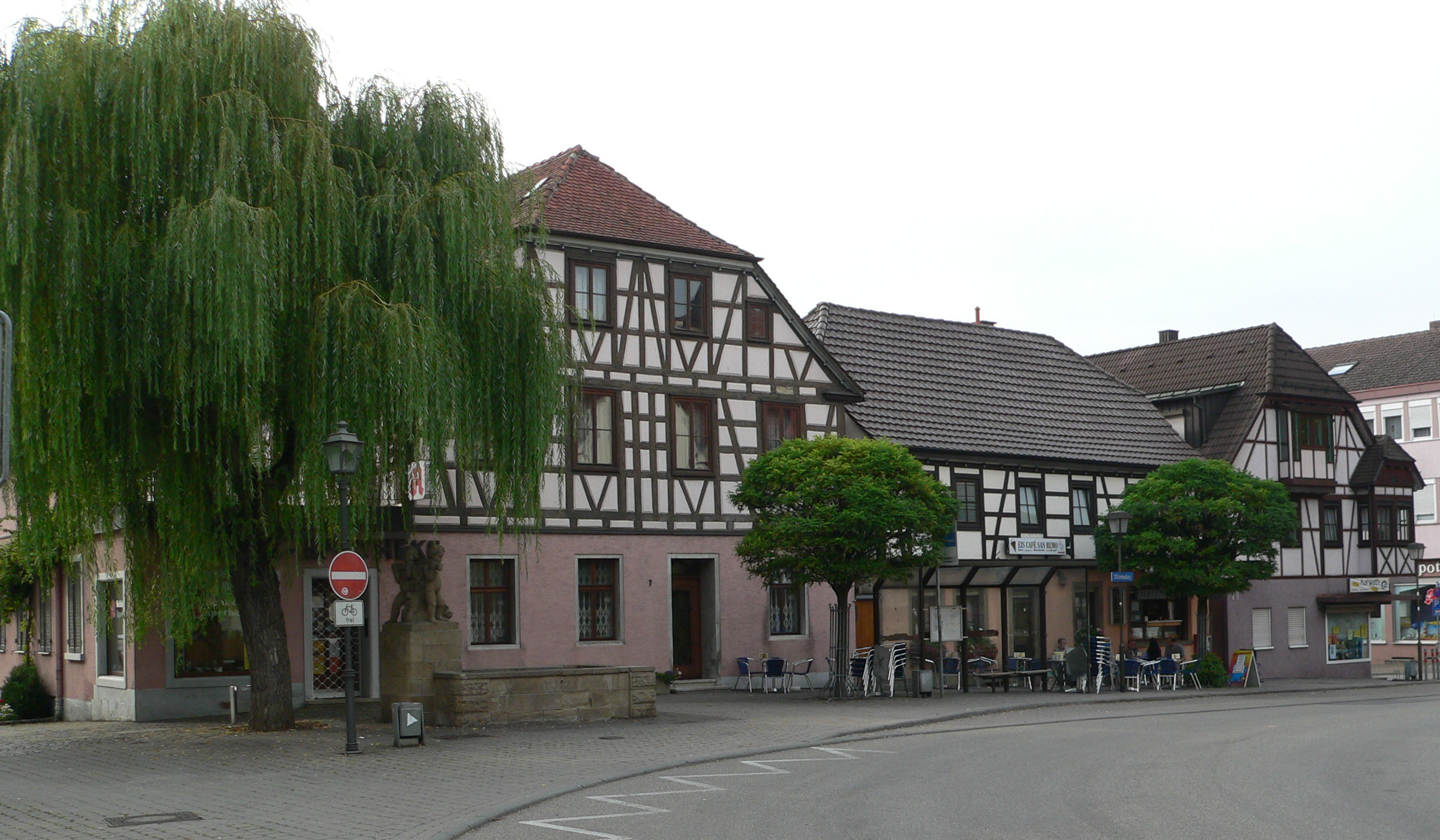
Old timber framing
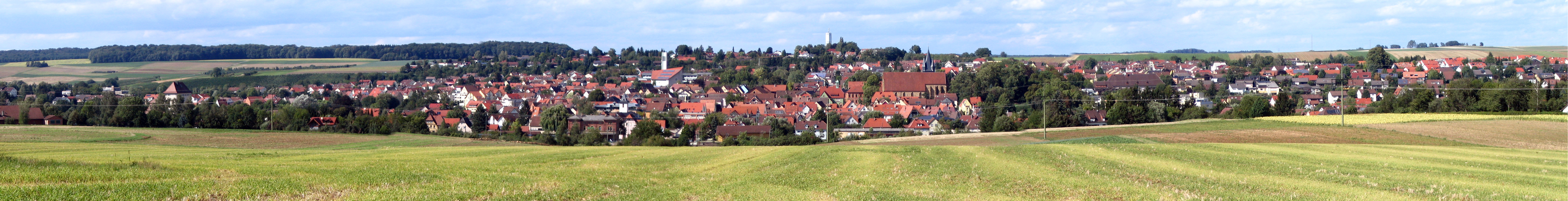
Panorama of Schwaigern
