= An der Etsch =

European polity

Teutonic Bailiwick on the Adige and in the mountains Deutschordensballei An der Etsch und im Gebirge
- 1260–1805
- Coat of arms of the Teutonic Order

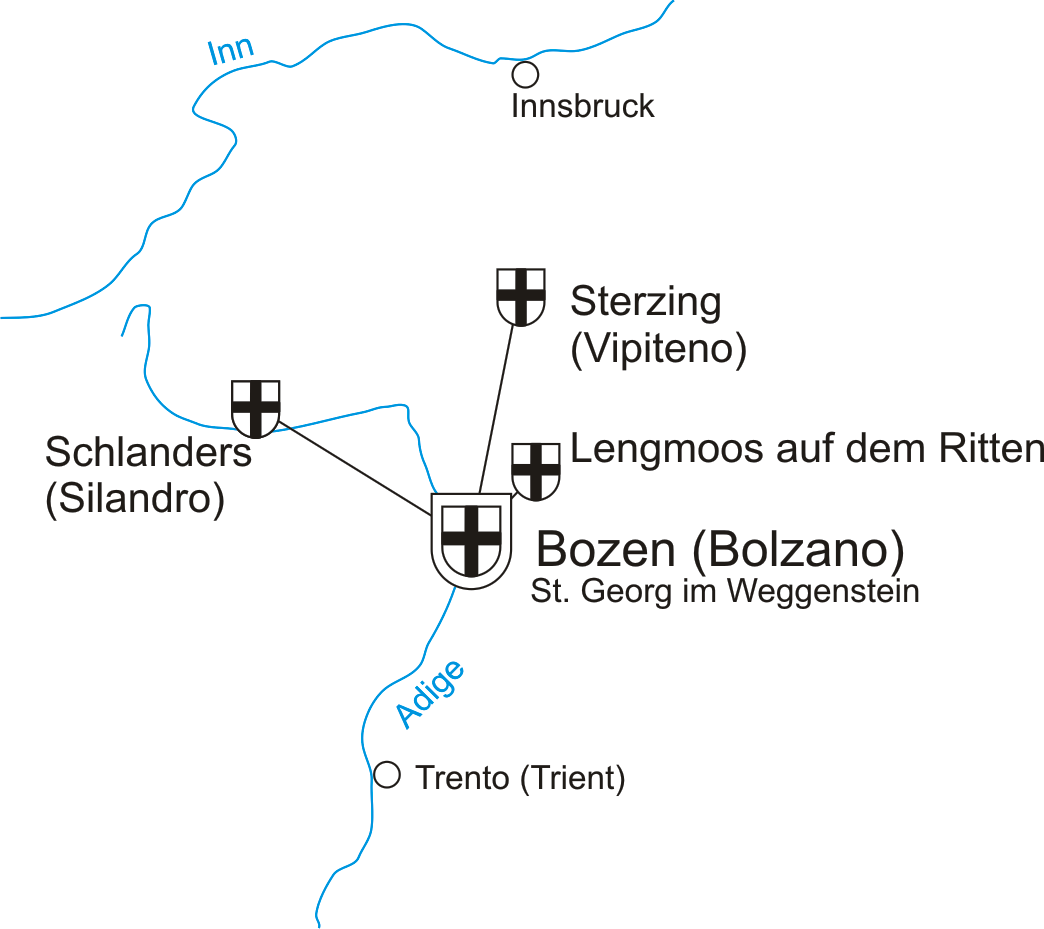
- Commandries in 1788
- Status: State of the Holy Roman Empire
- Capital: Bolzano; 46.493526°N 11.340593°E
- Common languages: Southern Bavarian
- Government: Theocracy
- Historical era: Middle Ages
  - Established: 1260
  - Joined Austrian Circle: 1512
  - Ceded to Kingdom of Bavaria: 1805
Succeeded by
County of Tyrol / County of Tyrol

An der Etsch und im Gebirge (German for 'On the Etsch and in the Mountains') was a bailiwick (Ballei) of the Teutonic Order, created about 1260 and headquartered in Bolzano (Bozen), now in the Italian province of South Tyrol, comprising several commandries in the former County of Tyrol and the adjacent Bishopric of Trent.

One of the Teutonic provinces within the Holy Roman Empire, An der Etsch held the feudal status of Imperial immediacy as a registered Imperial State. Its commandries were subordinate to a Landkomtur (commendator provincialis), who himself was answerable to the Deutschmeister commander of all bailiwicks in Germany and Italy, at times directly to the Grand Master.

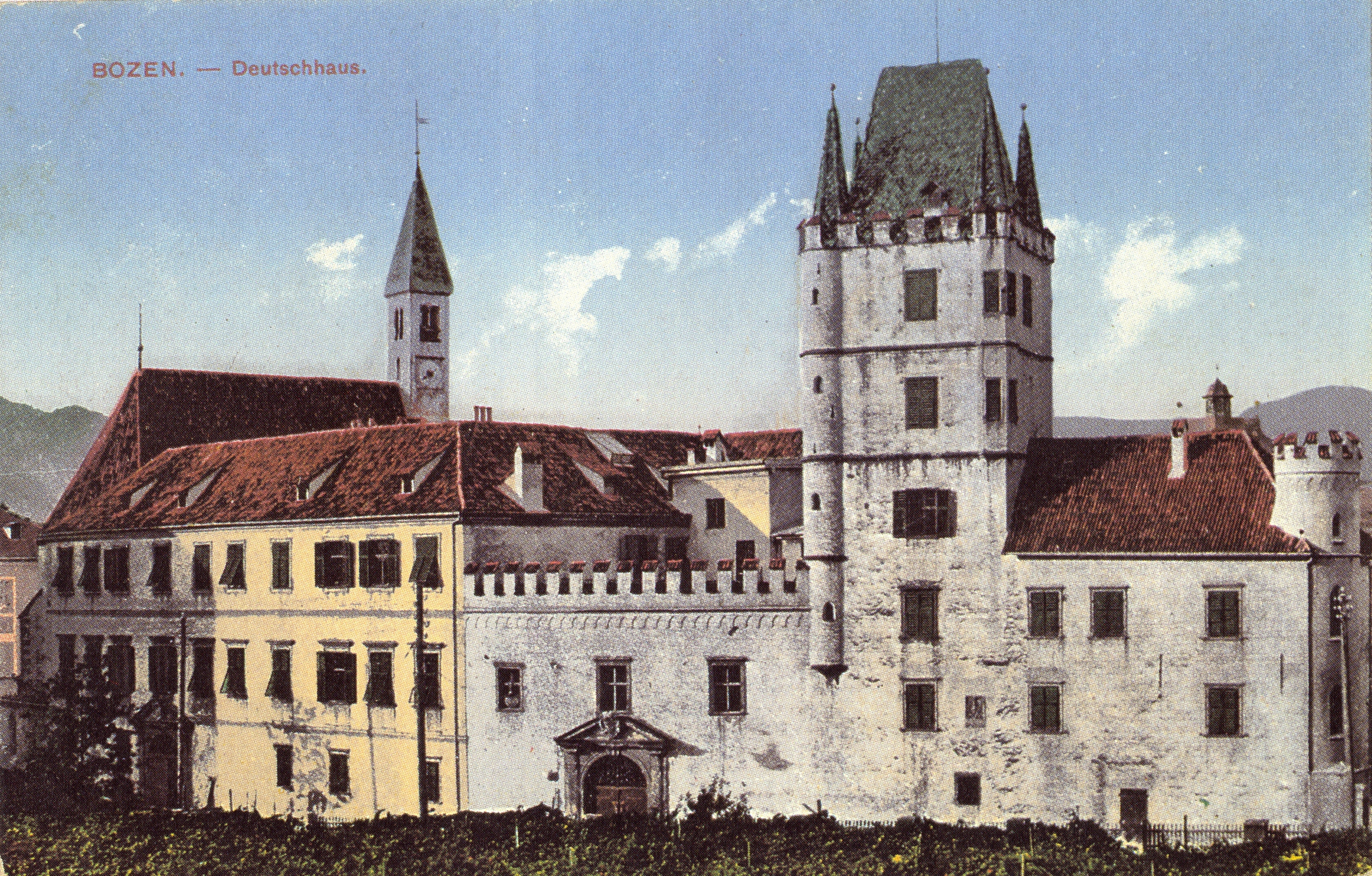
Commandry (Deutschhaus) Bolzano

== History ==
The Teutonic Knights had erected a first hospital at the confluence of Etsch and Eisack near Bozen in 1202, followed by several hostels along the mountain road up to the Brenner Pass, vital for the Holy Roman Emperors heading for Italy or on crusades to the Holy Land.

The bailiwick lost its autonomy during the Napoleonic Wars upon the 1805 Peace of Pressburg, when Tyrol was ceded to the newly established Kingdom of Bavaria and finally incorporated into the Austrian Empire in 1814. From the view of the Teutonic Order, the province was never disestablished and up to today An der Etsch denotes the lay brothers' organisation in South Tyrol.

== Commandries around 1400 ==
- Bolzano
- Lana
- Lengmoos
- Schlanders
- Sterzing
- St. Leonhard
- Trento
