= County of Neipperg =

Former county of southeastern Baden-Württemberg, Germany

Coordinates: 49°8′N 9°3′E

Barony (County) of Neipperg Freiherrschaft (Grafschaft) Neipperg
- 1241–1806
- Coat of arms
- Status: County
- Capital: Schwaigern
- Historical era: Early modern period
  - First mentioned: 1241
  - Raised to county: 1726
  - Mediatised to Württemberg: 1806
Preceded by	Succeeded by
Neipperg-Schwaigern	Kingdom of Württemberg

County of Neipperg was an Imperial county in the southeastern Baden-Württemberg, Germany. Barony of Neipperg-Schwaigern was created in 1520 as a baronial partition of the Barony of Neipperg, It was renamed from Neipperg-Schwaigern in 1726, and raised to a county in 1766. Neipperg was mediatised to the Kingdom of Württemberg in 1806.

== Counts of Neipperg (1726–1806) ==
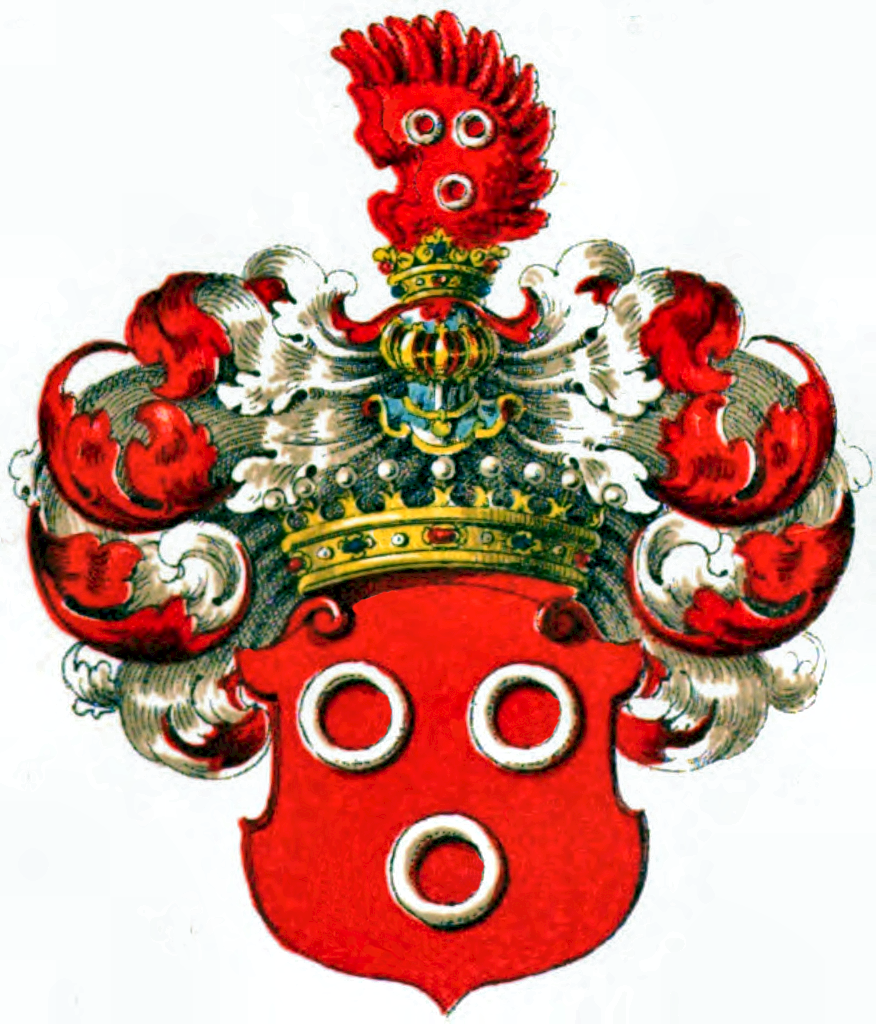
Coat of arms of the Counts of Neipperg (1726)

- Wilhelm Reinhard (1726–1774)
- Leopold (1774–1792)
- Joseph (1792–1806)
