= Holzapfel =

Holzapfel is a surname. Notable people with the surname include:

- Beate Holzapfel (born 1966), retired West German high jumper
- Brigitte Holzapfel (born 1958), retired West German high jumper
- Friedrich Holzapfel (1900–1969), German politician
- Hartmut Holzapfel (1944–2022), former Hessian Minister of Culture, Chairman of the Hessian Council on Literature
- Helmut Holzapfel (tenor) (born 1941), South African tenor
- Helmut Holzapfel (urban planner) (born 1950), German academic
- James W. Holzapfel (born 1944), American Republican Party politician, served in the New Jersey General Assembly
- Klaus-Jürgen Holzapfel (1930–2025), German publisher
- Riley Holzapfel (born 1988), Canadian professional ice hockey player
- Rudi Holzapfel (1938–2005), Irish poet and teacher
- Rudolf Maria Holzapfel (1874–1930), Poland-born Austrian psychologist, philosopher

== See also ==
- Holzappel
