= Are-Nürburg =

Medieval noble branch of the Counts of Are in the western Eifel

- Coat of arms
- Status: Lordship
- Capital: Nürburg
- Government: Comital lordship
- Historical era: Middle Ages

Are-Nürburg was a medieval branch of the Counts of Are in the Holy Roman Empire, centered on Nürburg and the surrounding territory in the western Eifel. It emerged from the division of the possessions of the Counts of Are in the 12th century and was centered on Nürburg Castle.

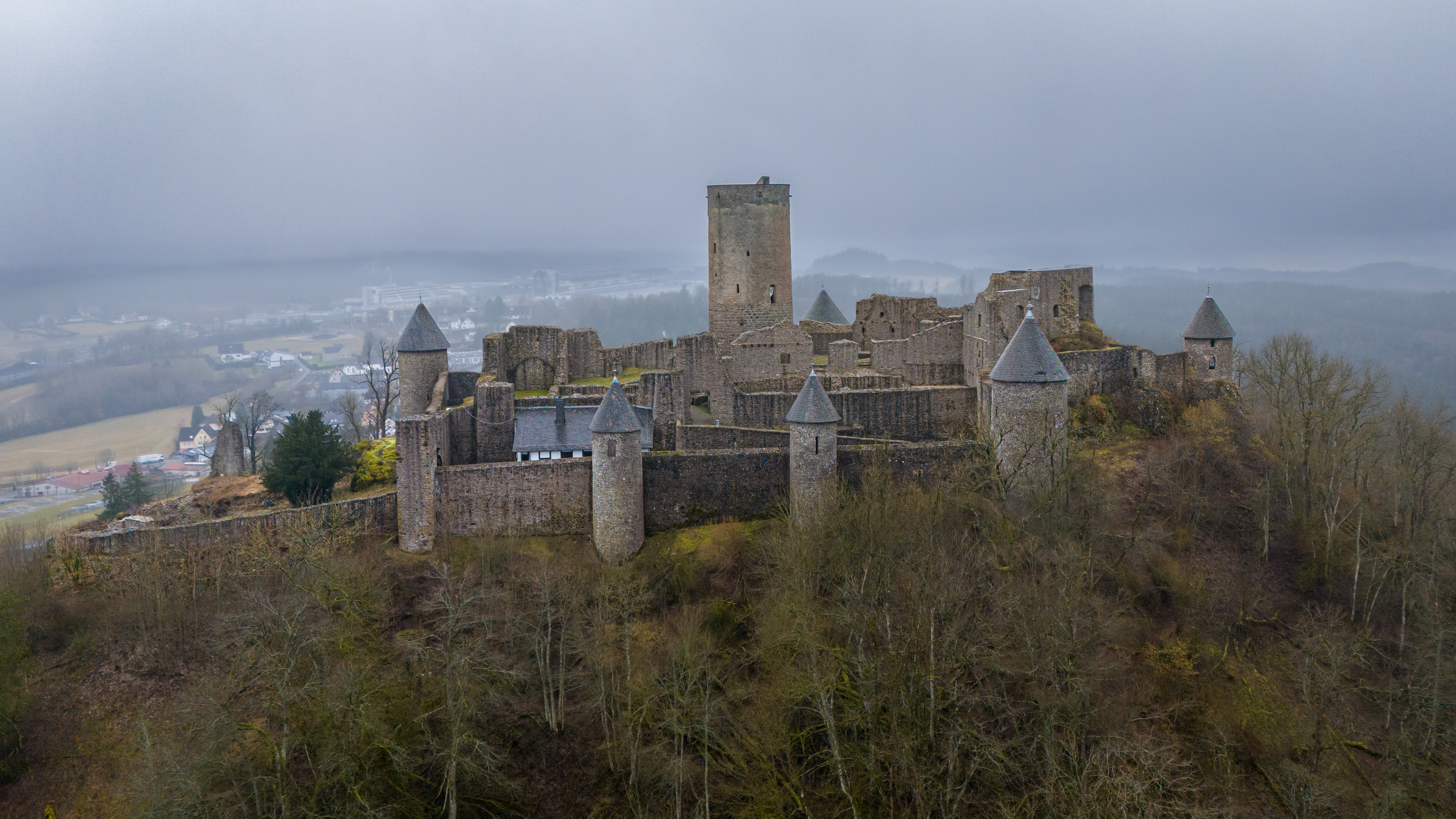
Aerial view of Nürburg Castle, the principal seat of the branch.

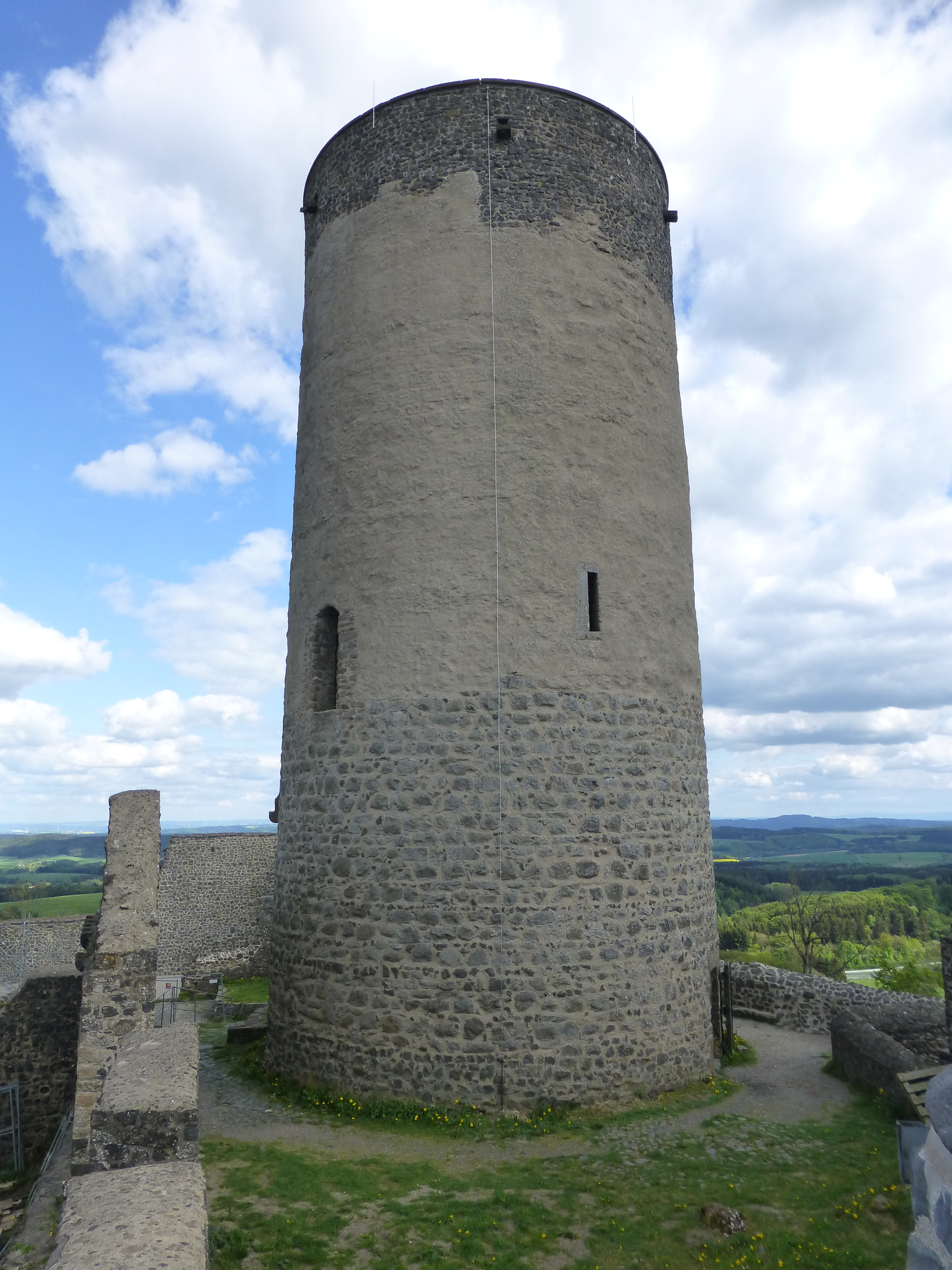
The keep of Nürburg Castle.

The branch controlled a lordship around Nürburg and Adenau, together with scattered estates and rights elsewhere in the Rhineland. In the 13th century it became increasingly dependent on the Electorate of Cologne, while its possessions were divided among several members of the family.

== History ==
=== Origins ===
The Counts of Are were a prominent noble family in the Rhineland, whose principal seat was Are Castle above Altenahr. From around 1140, the family developed into several branches. Ulrich, a son of Count Theoderich I of Are, established the Are-Nürburg side line, while his brother Otto established the Are-Hochstaden line through his marriage to Adelheid, heiress of Hochstaden.

Nürburg Castle was probably begun in the first half of the 12th century and was developed into the principal seat of the branch by Ulrich. He is first documented in connection with the castle in 1169 and was using the title Count of Nürburg by 1144. A document of 1166 records the castle as an open house of the Archbishop of Cologne, giving the archbishop rights of access and use.

=== Gerhard of Are-Nürburg ===
Gerhard of Are-Nürburg (died 1221) was one of the most prominent members of the branch. He was Vogt of Maria Laach Abbey and held extensive rights in the Ahr region.

Gerhard's exercise of his rights as Vogt led to a dispute with the monastery. In 1209 he renounced the advocacy, receiving several former monastic possessions, including estates at Wadenheim, Lohrsdorf, Ahrweiler and Walporzheim, as fiefs of Cologne. Two of his sons later protested against the settlement before relinquishing their claims in return for compensation.

After Gerhard's death, his inheritance was divided between his sons. His elder son Theoderich received the County of Nürburg and the Amt of Adenau, while his younger son Otto received territory in the lower Ahr and established the line that became known as Are-Neuenahr.

=== Territory and possessions ===
The Nürburg lordship was concentrated around Nürburg and Adenau, but its possessions were not territorially continuous. They consisted of estates, fiefs, revenues and jurisdictional rights.

Adenau was an important center of the lordship. In 1162, Ulrich of Are donated his manor there to the Johanniter. In 1224, Gerhard transferred the parish church of Adenau to the Johanniter commandery.

The family's possessions also extended beyond the upper Ahr and Eifel. Dohr on the Moselle belonged to the allodial possessions of the Counts of Are and passed to Ulrich of Are-Nürburg during the division of the family property. Gerhard later held Dohr and Bullay as fiefs of the Archbishopric of Trier.

=== Decline ===
In the 13th century, the Counts of Nürburg became increasingly dependent on the Electorate of Cologne. The Göttingen project Höfe und Residenzen im spätmittelalterlichen Reich describes the Counts of Nürburg as ministeriales of the Cologne archbishopric and attributes their declining importance to financial difficulties and Cologne's expanding political influence.

On 15 June 1276, Hadwig, widow of Count Theoderich of Nürburg, pledged the County and Land of Nürburg, together with their revenues and rights, to the Archbishop of Cologne for four years because of financial difficulties. The castle itself was excluded from the pledge.

In 1280, Wilhelm I of Nürburg received the castle as a Cologne fief and open castle and became a castle-man of the archbishop. On 1 November 1295, he was appointed Count of Nürburg. In 1297–1298, he also received castles and villages in the Eifel and Westerwald as Cologne fiefs.

The Are-Nürburg branch is dated to about 1280 in the scholarly literature. The older Nürburg line continued into the 14th century. Wilhelm III of Nürburg is documented from 1342 to 1353, during a period in which the family's political importance was further reduced by its dependence on other territorial powers. After Wilhelm III's death, the County of Nürburg passed to his daughter Katharina, whose inheritance became the subject of a prolonged dispute involving the Saffenberg family and other claimants.

The Nürburg inheritance dispute continued into the second half of the 14th century. In 1372, the castles of Nürburg, Roesberg and Merzenich were destroyed during the conflict.
