= Christian Seybold =

German Baroque painter

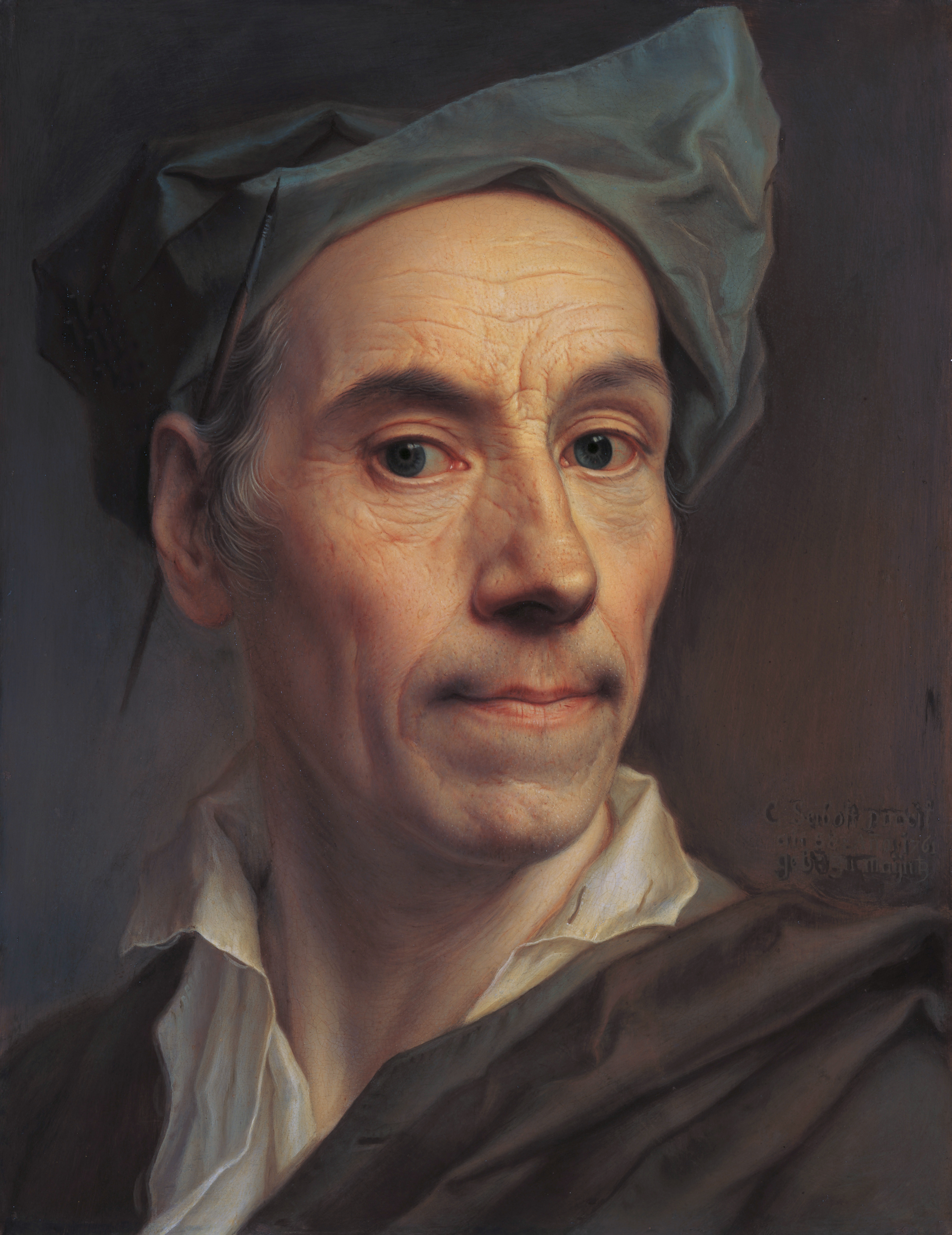
Self-portrait (1761)

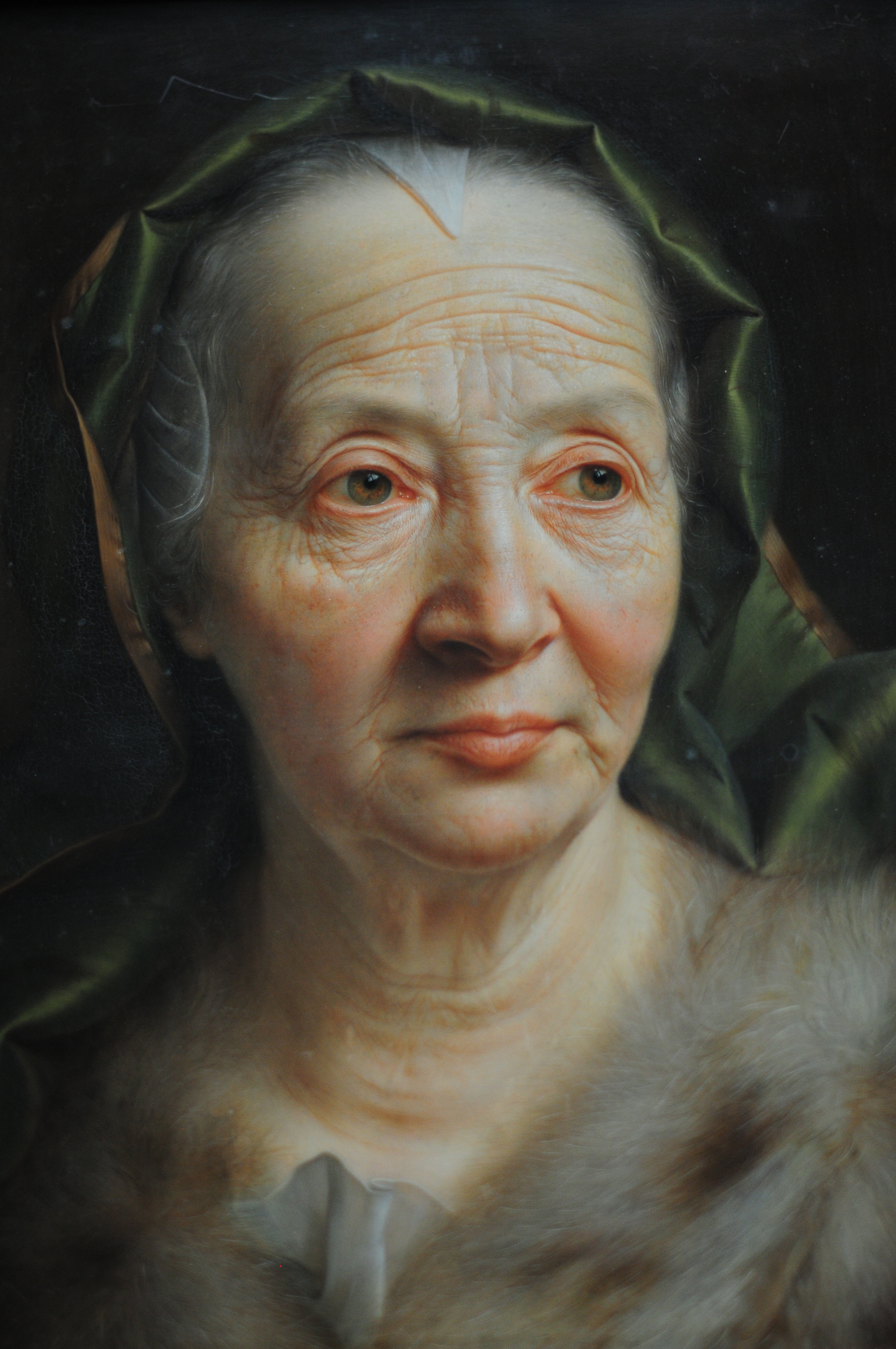
Portrait of an Old Woman

Christian Seybold (19 March 1695, Neuenhain, Bad Soden - 29 September 1768, Vienna) was a German painter in the Baroque style. He is best known for his detailed, realistic character heads and portraits (over two dozen of himself), which sometimes stood out from the idealized ones preferred at that time. Most of his works can be classified as tronies.

== Biography ==
Little is known about his childhood and education. He was one of eleven children in a family that originally came from Oberursel. At some unknown date, he moved to Vienna. There, in 1715, he married and became a father only three weeks later. Both his wife and child died within the following two years: his son Johann Michael only 23 days after his birth. His wife Elisabeth died 26 October 1717. Within less than seven months, he remarried. His second wife, Susanna, had two children who would live into their adulthood.

In 1745 he received an appointment as court painter to King Augustus III, who was also the Elector of Saxony, in Dresden, Four years later, he was named to fill the same position at the court of Empress Maria Theresa.

The style for his detailed character heads was heavily influenced by Balthasar Denner. For his self-portraits, he was primarily influenced by Jan Kupecký and Rembrandt. One of his first datable portraits (after 1723, before 1728) is of the imperial counsellor, Count Johann Adam von Questenberg; a prominent patron of the arts. Today his paintings are widely scattered, from the Louvre to the Uffizi and the Hermitage.
