= Bad Soden =

Town in Hesse, Germany

- Town
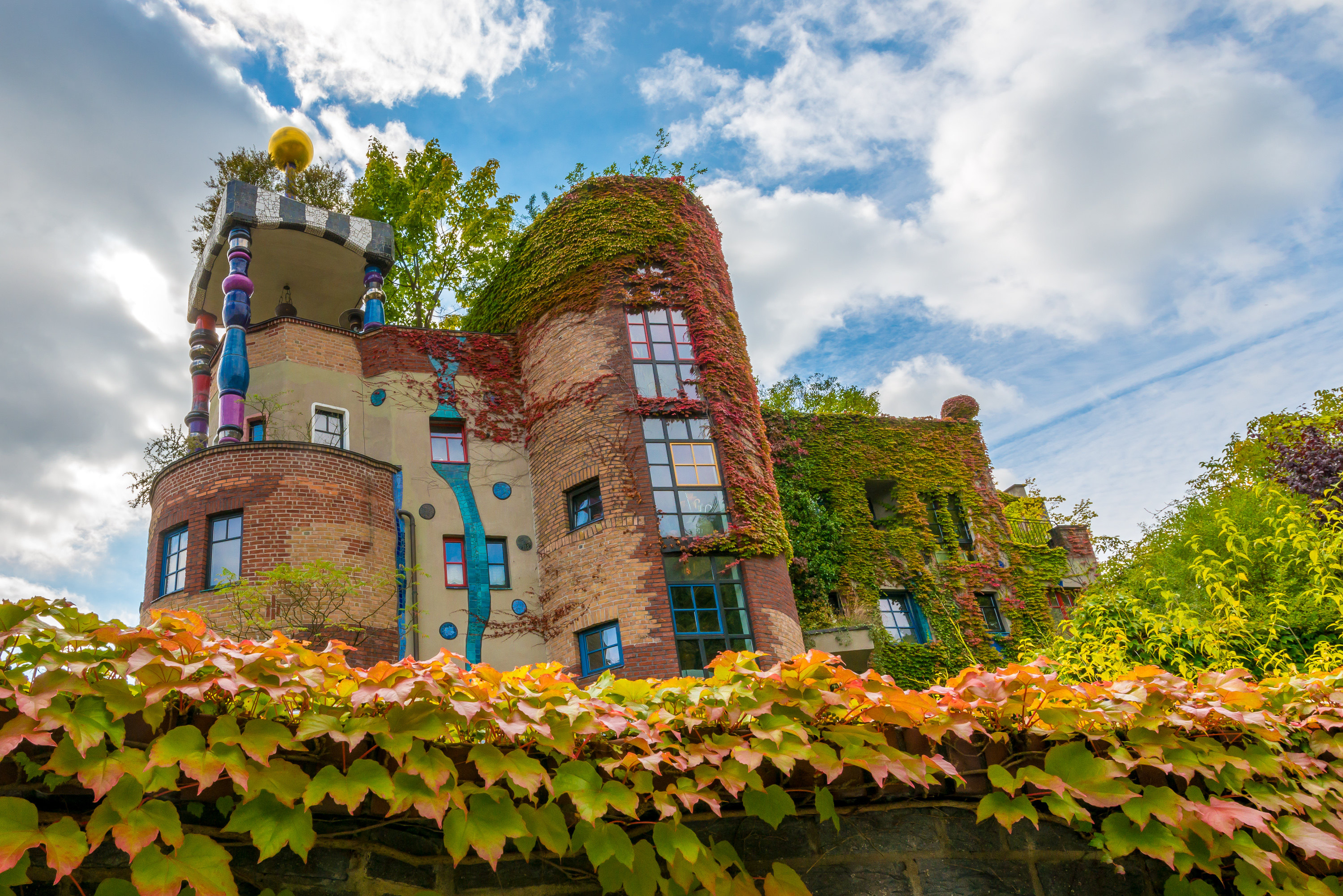
- Residential building in Bad Soden, designed by Friedensreich Hundertwasser

- Coat of arms

- Location of Bad Soden within Main-Taunus-Kreis district
- Interactive map of Bad Soden
- Location within Germany Location within Hesse
- Coordinates: 50°08′N 08°30′E
- Country: Germany
- State: Hesse
- Admin. region: Darmstadt
- District: Main-Taunus-Kreis
- Subdivisions: 3 Stadtteile: Bad Soden, Neuenhain, Altenhain

Government
  - Mayor (2023–29): Frank Blasch (CDU)

Area
  - Total: 12.5 km^{2} (4.8 sq mi)
- Elevation: 130–385 m (427–1,263 ft)

Population (2025-12-31)
  - Total: 23,096
  - Density: 1,850/km^{2} (4,790/sq mi)
- Time zone: UTC+01:00 (CET)
  - Summer (DST): UTC+02:00 (CEST)
- Postal codes: 65812
- Dialling codes: 06196, 06174 (Altenhain)
- Vehicle registration: MTK
- Website: www.bad-soden.de

Bad Soden am Taunus (German pronunciation: [baːt ˈzoːdn̩ ʔam ˈtaʊnʊs], lit. 'Bad Soden on the Taunus'), commonly known as Bad Soden, is a town and spa in the Main-Taunus-Kreis, Hessen, Germany. It had a population of 22,563 as of 2017, up from 21,412 in 2005.

== Information ==
Bad Soden is a residential town for commuters working in Frankfurt am Main and other surrounding cities. It is known for its various springs, which contain carbonic acid gas and various iron oxides. The waters are used both internally and externally, and are widely exported. Soden lozenges (German: Sodener Pastillen), condensed from the waters, are also in great demand. Bad Soden has a well-appointed Kurhaus, an Evangelical and a Roman Catholic church, and a hospital. It also has a residential building by the architect Friedensreich Hundertwasser. Bad Soden has two Districts: Altenhein am Taunus and Neuenhein am Taunus.

== Mayors ==
Mayors from 1893:

- 1893–1912: Georg Busz
- 1912–1920: Friedrich Höh
- 1920–1923: Niederschulte
- 1925–1937: Alfred Benninghoven
- 1937–1939: Jakob Rittgen
- 1939–1945: Karl Bohle
- 1945–1948: Kuno Mayer
- 1948–1957: Gilbert Just
- 1957–1967: August Karl Wallis
- 1967–1973: Helmuth Schwinge
- 1973–1977: Hans-Helmut Kämmerer
- 1977–1985: Volker Hodann
- 1985–1986: Hans Jörg Röhrich (official by the government)
- 1986–1992: Berthold R. Gall
- 1992–2004: Kurt E. Bender
- 2004–2018: Norbert Altenkamp
- 2018–present: Frank Blasch

== Notable people ==
- Elvira Bach (born 1951), artist and painter, she was born in Neuenhain (Taunus) and lives in Berlin since 1970
- Gerhard Bärsch (born 1988), politician
- Otto Frank (1889–1980), father of Anne Frank, worked in Bad Soden before moving to the Netherlands with his family
- Peter Lang (1878–1954), member of the parliament of the People's State of Hesse in the Weimar Republic
- Christian Seybold (1695–1768), artist of the era of Baroque; was baptized in Neuenhain (Taunus), lived until 1715 in Soden
- Georg Thilenius (1868–1937), ethnologist and anthropologist
- Sabine Winter (born 1992), table tennis player, was born in Bad Soden
- Edward Wunderly, physician and Milwaukee, Wisconsin politician, was from Bad Soden

== Twin towns – sister cities ==
Bad Soden is twinned with:

- Rueil-Malmaison, France (1975)
- Kitzbühel, Austria (1984)
- Františkovy Lázně, Czech Republic (1992)
- Yōrō, Japan (2004)
- Franklin, United States (2016)

== Gallery ==
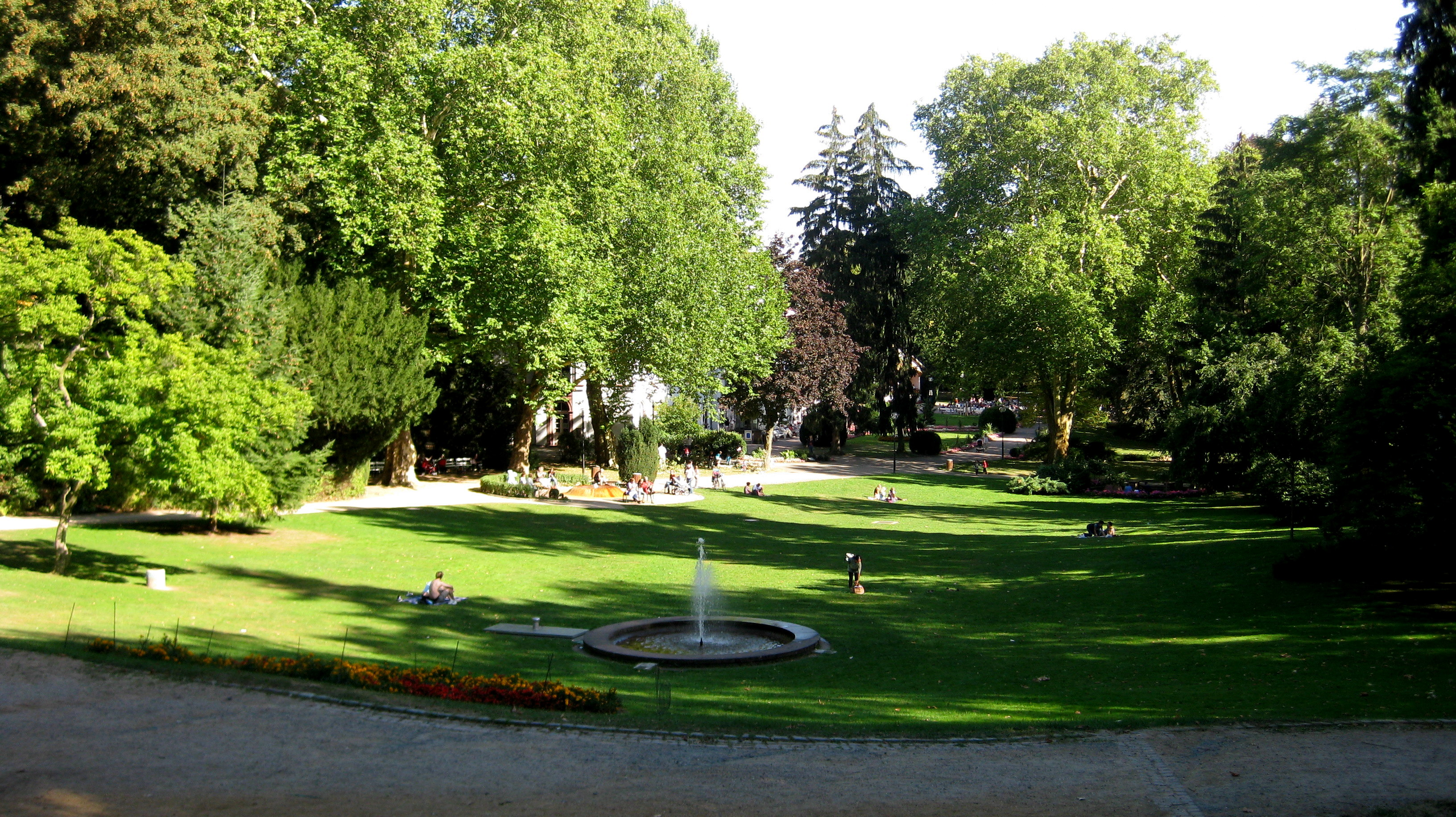
The old Park

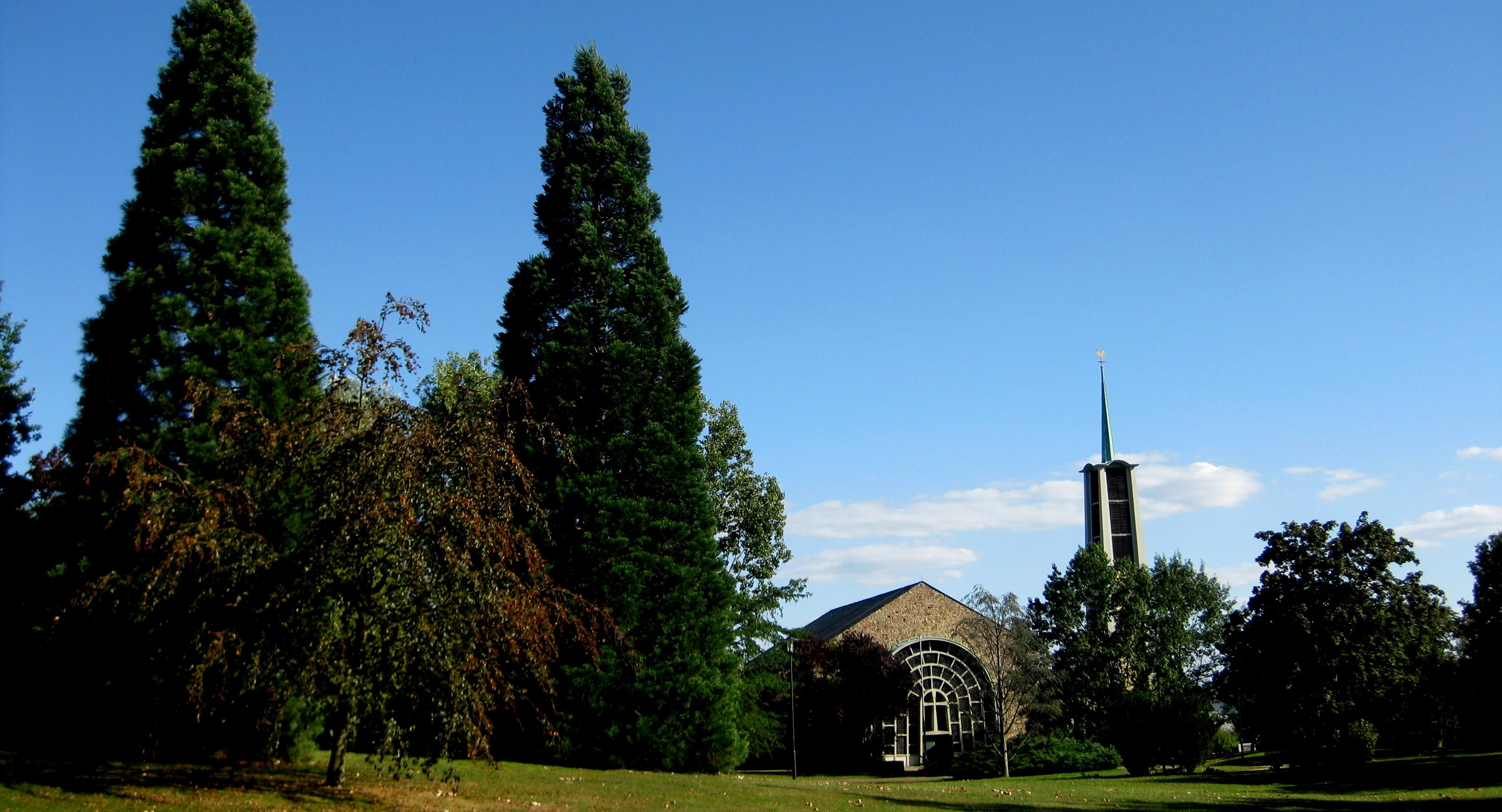
New park with Catholic Church

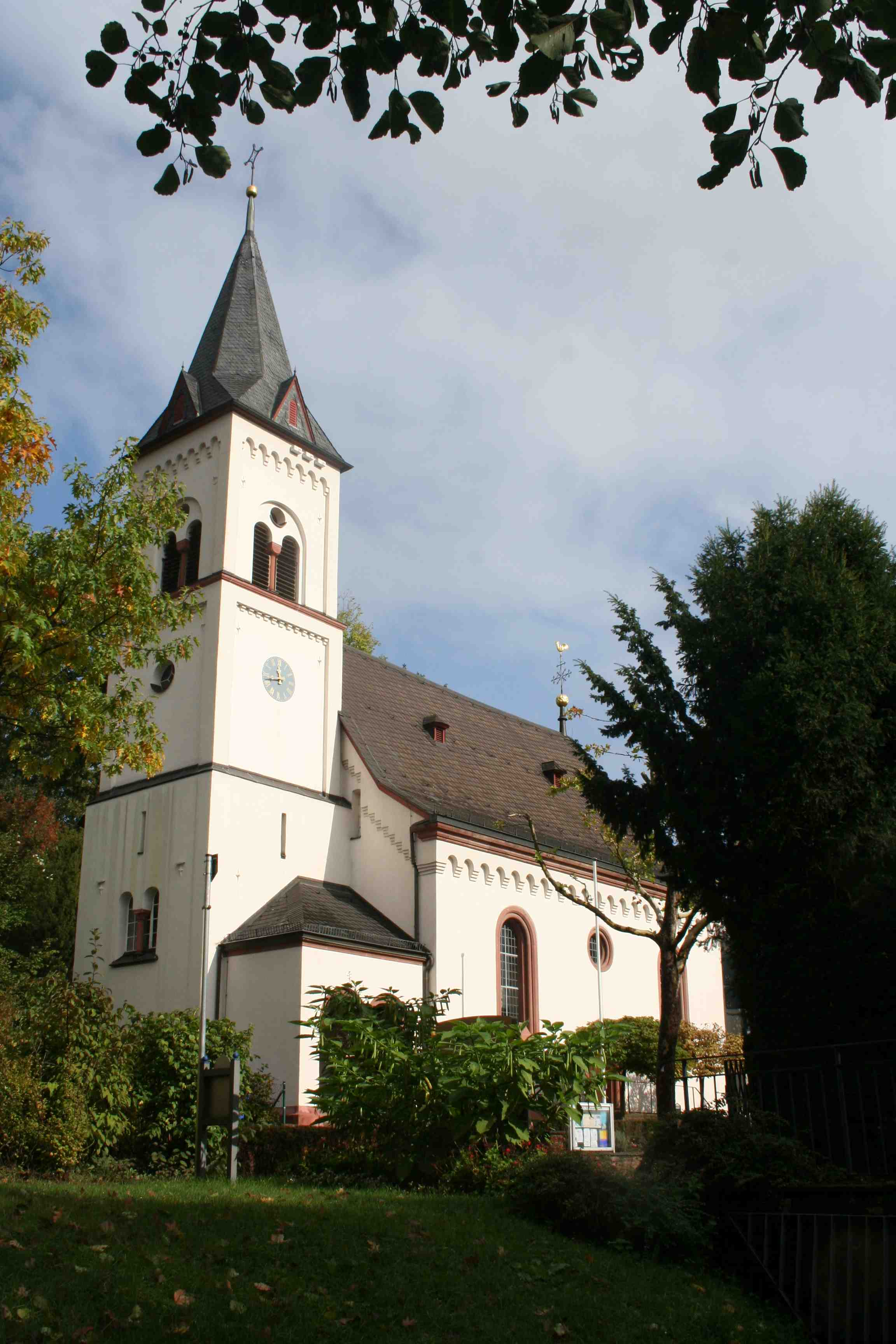
Protestant Church

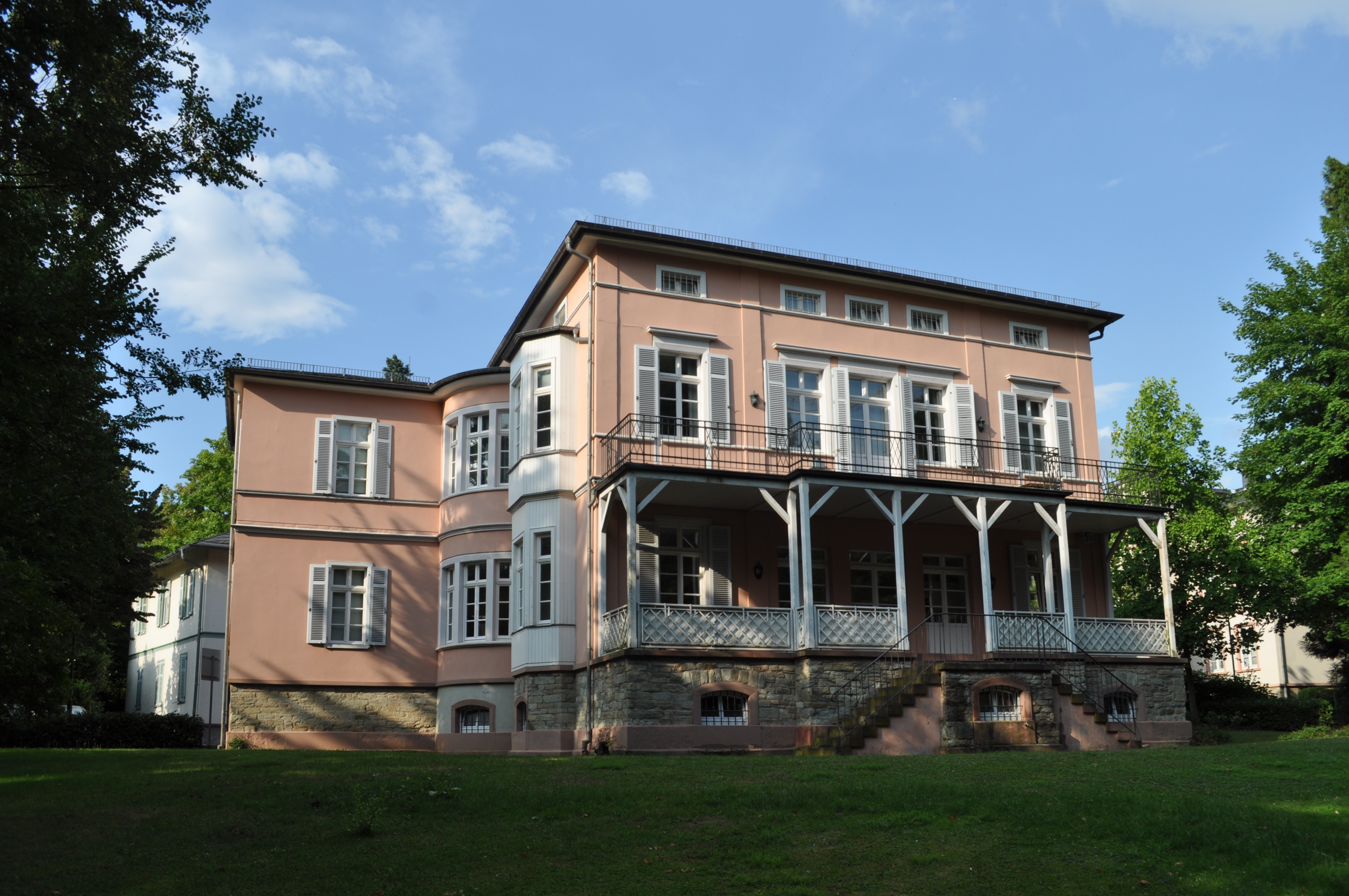
"Paulinenschlösschen"

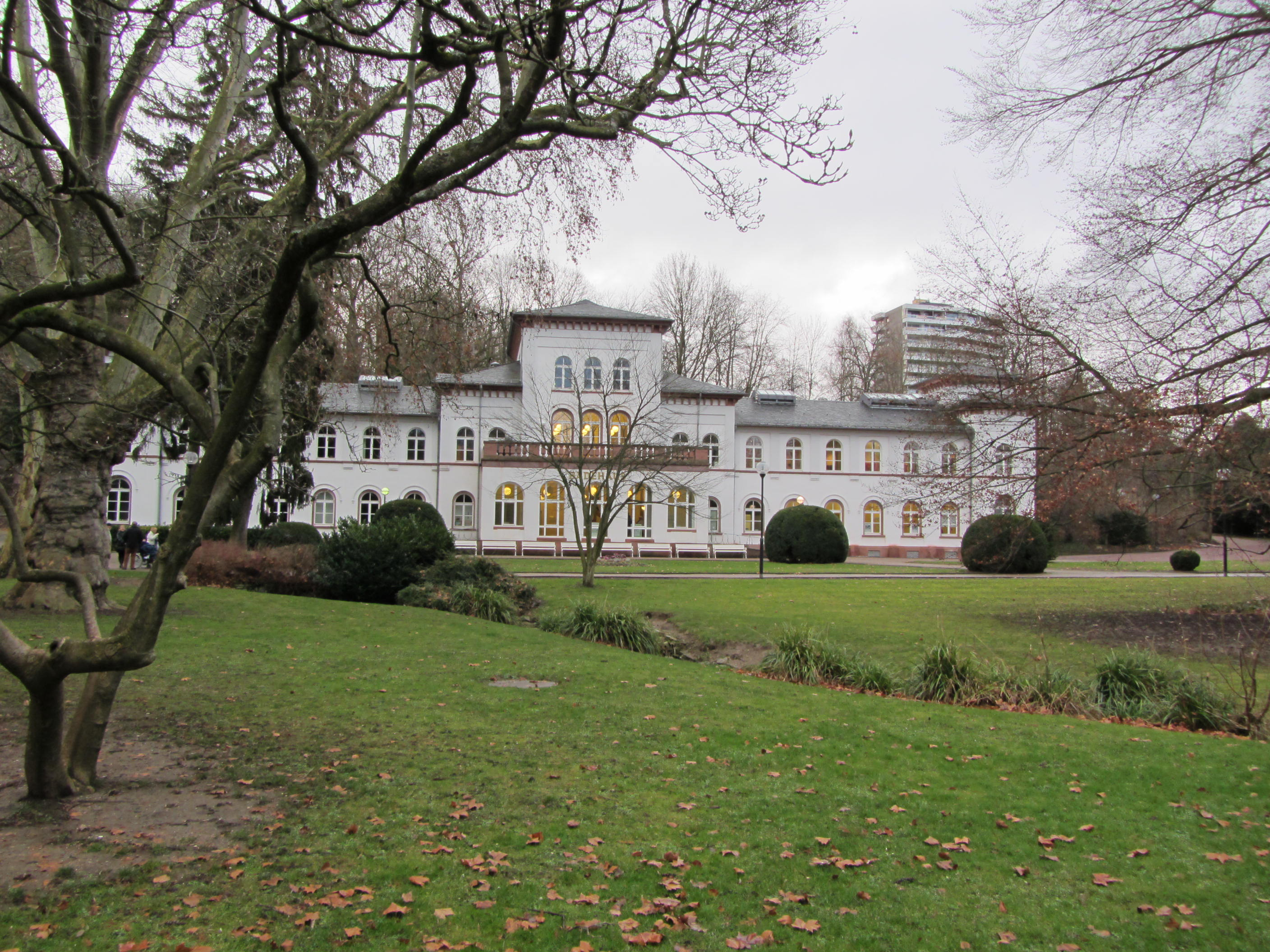
"Badehaus" - The bathhouse

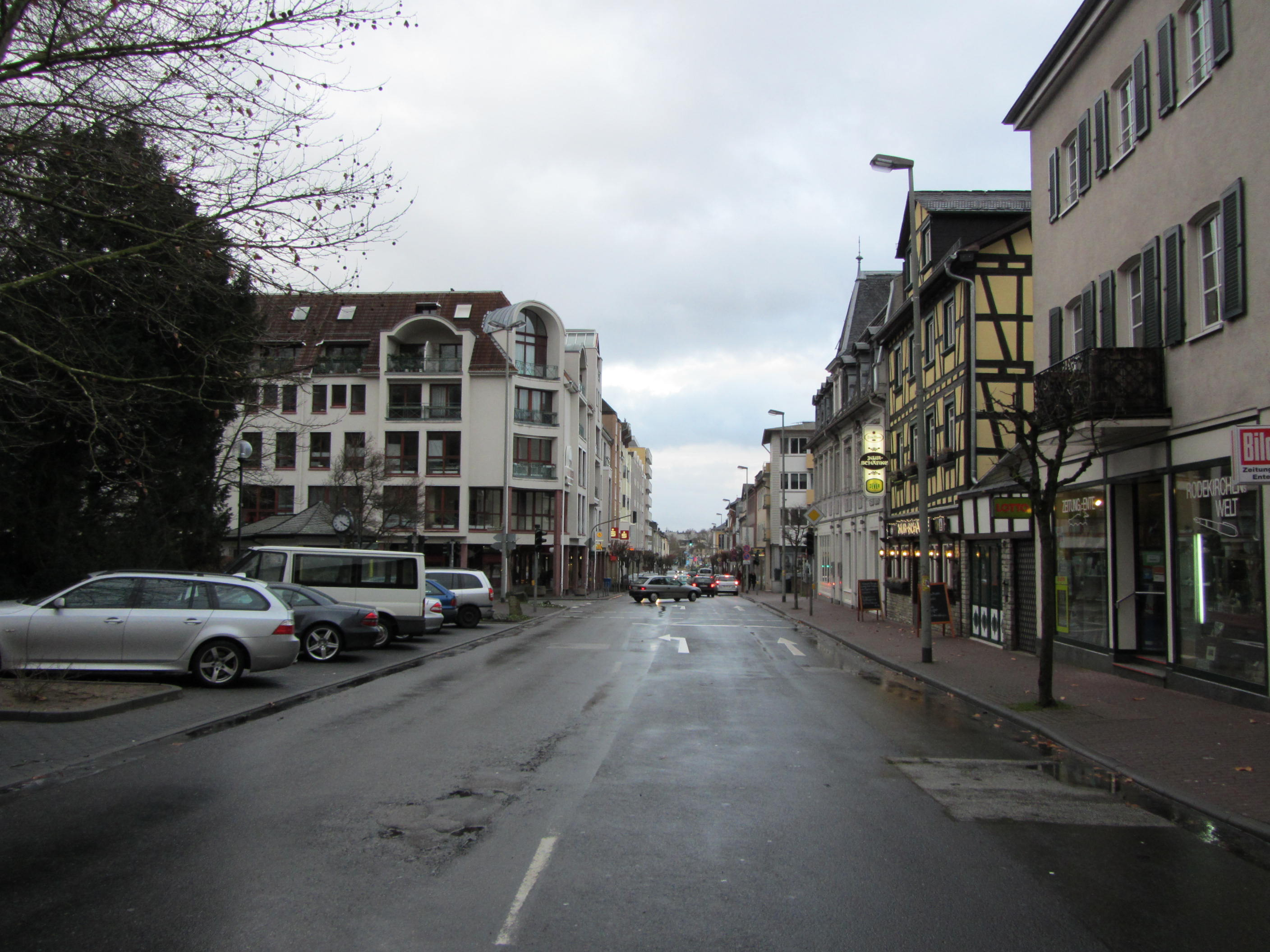
The "Königsteiner Straße"

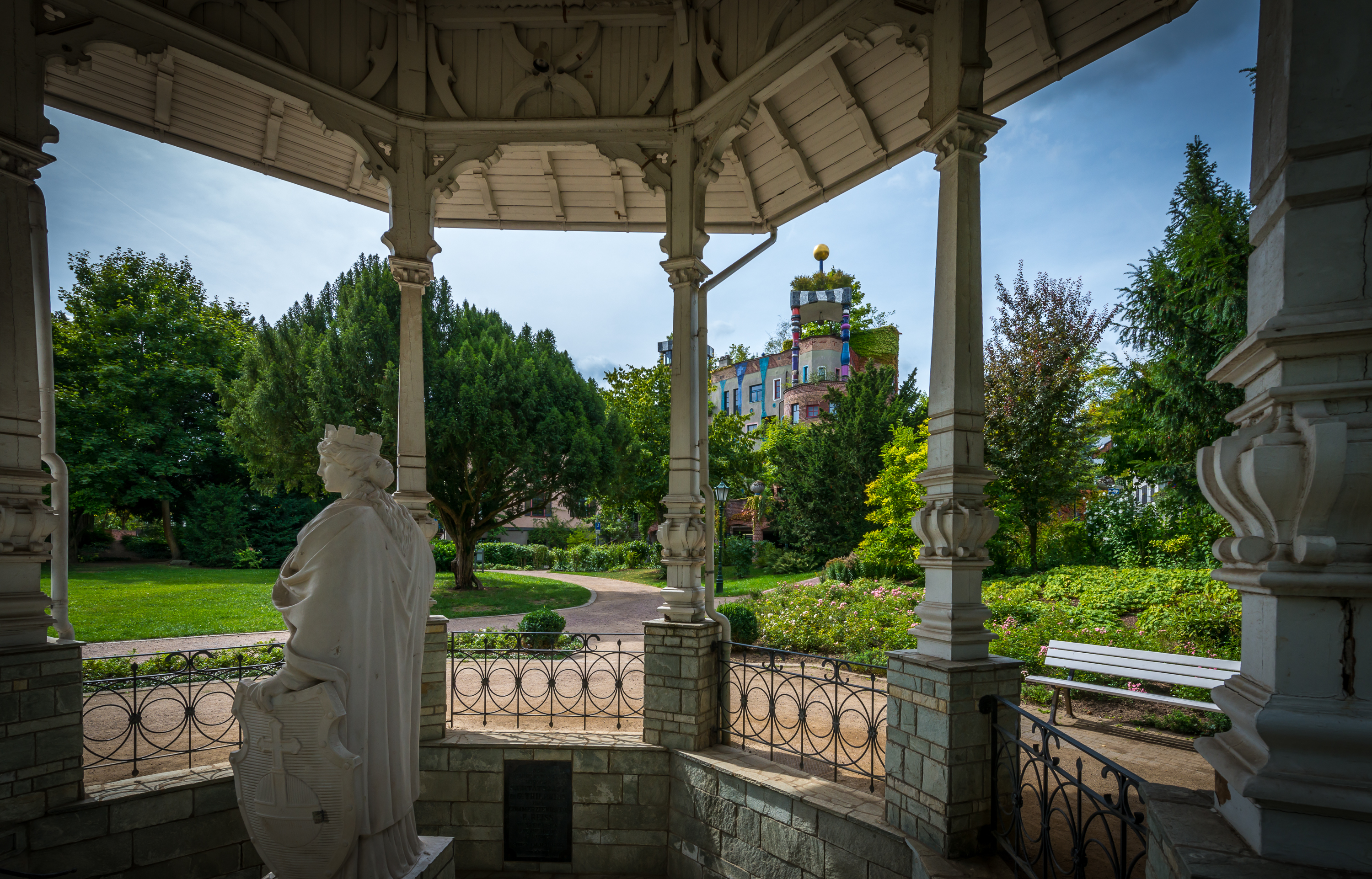
Quellenpark

== References in Literature ==
In Leo Tolstoy's Anna Karenina, the Scherbatskys retire to Bad Soden to cure Kitty's illness.

In Ivan Turgenev's "Spring Torrents," Dimitry Sanin takes a trip with his future lover, Gemma, and her current fiancé to Soden, "a small town about half an hour's distance from Frankfurt".

Featured heavily in Part 3 of Thomas Pynchon's Gravity's Rainbow.

== See also ==
- Woco Group
