= Aulic Council =

One of the two supreme courts of the Holy Roman Empire (1498-1806)

- Reichshofrat
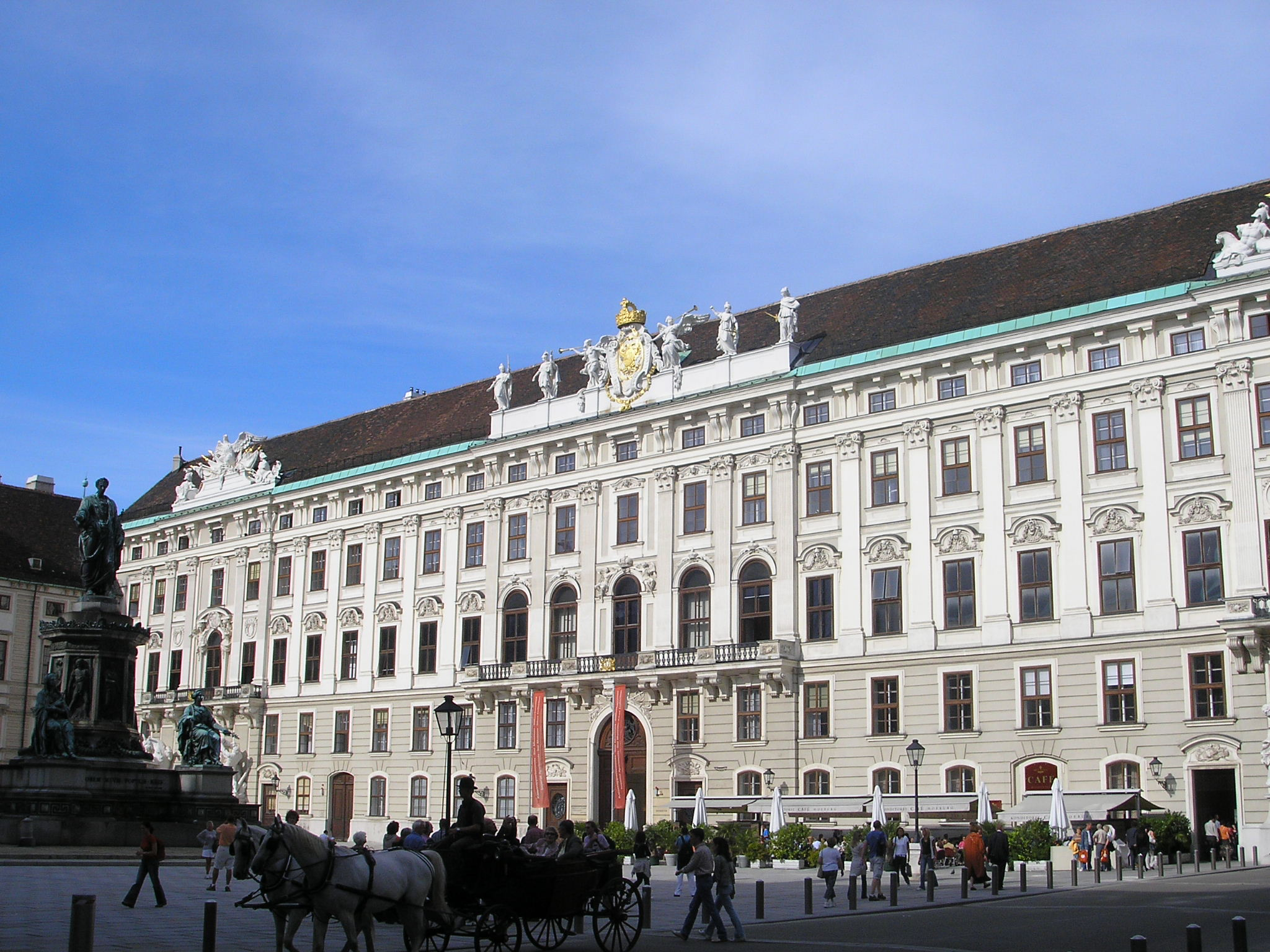
- Reichskanzlei wing of the Hofburg, Vienna

- Banner of the Holy Roman Empire
- Established: 1498 (organization by Maximilian I)
- Dissolved: 1806 (dissolution of the Holy Roman Empire)
- Jurisdiction: One of the two supreme courts in the Holy Roman Empire, with concurrent jurisdiction with the Reichskammergericht on certain matters, and exclusive jurisdiction on others
- Location: Prague, Wels, Frankfurt, and Vienna
- Composition method: Councilors were appointed by the Holy Roman Emperor, with the exception of the Vice-Chancellor, which is appointed by the Elector of Mainz
- Authorised by: Holy Roman Emperor
- Number of positions: President, Vice-President, Councilor, Fiskal, and more
- Language: Mainly German

The Aulic Council (Latin: Consilium Aulicum; German: Reichshofrat; literally 'Court Council of the Empire', sometimes abbreviated in academic writing as "RHR") was one of the two supreme courts of the Holy Roman Empire, the other being the Reichskammergericht (Imperial Chamber Court). Unlike the Reichskammergericht, which was tied to the Imperial estates, the Aulic Council was tied directly to the Emperor.

It had not only concurrent jurisdiction with the Reichskammergericht, but in many cases exclusive jurisdiction: the Aulic Council had exclusive jurisdiction in all "feudal" processes, and in criminal affairs, over the immediate subjects of the Emperor and in affairs which concerned the Empire, and more (see Responsibilities section below). It did not have a single set seat, rather, it was bound with the Emperor's residences. Prague, Wels, and Frankfurt, were all sites of the court, but the most important seat of the Aulic Council was at the Hofburg residence of the Habsburg emperors in Vienna.

Since 1960, the Aulic Council has been extensively researched in academia, with some of its former court files (of which there are more than 100,000 that still exist) stored at the Austrian State Archives. It played a major role in the constitutional, legal, and political history of the Holy Roman Empire, and is considered one of the most prominent supreme courts in early modern Europe. In particular, the court helped stabilize the balance of power in the Empire and provided a forum for legal diplomacy, rather than violence. Historians often use the term juridification (Verrechtlichung) to describe this process of increased legal resolutions rather than violent resolutions in the Empire. As historian Eva Ortlieb puts it, "Like the Rota Romana and the Parlement de Paris, [the Aulic Council] ranks among the most significant supreme courts of Europe."

== History ==
To see responsibilities of the Aulic Council, go to the Responsibilities section. This section mainly goes over the development of the Aulic Council.

=== Early development during Maximilian I's, Charles V's, and Ferdinand I's reigns ===
The Aulic Council (from the Latin aula, court in feudal language, in antiquity a Hellenistic type of grand residence, usually private) was originally an executive-judicial council for the Empire. Originating during the Late Middle Ages as a paid Council of the Emperor, it was organized in its later form by Maximilian I by decree in 1498. It was meant as a rival to the separate Reichskammergericht, which the Imperial Estates had established at the Diet of Worms two years before. Maximilian emphasized the fact that the Emperor embodied supreme legal authority and would continue to answer legal requests addressed to him. There is also the possibility some of the Imperial estates wanted to create a court directly beholden to the Emperor so they could appeal to the Emperor directly. These developments are all considered part of a greater Imperial Reform movement, known as Reichsreform.

During the reign of Charles V, the Aulic Council responded to hundreds of petitions, as the Emperor was often absent from the Empire. The Aulic Council did not serve as a state council however. Important political questions were sent to the Emperor's privy council (Geheimer Rat), which would propose decisions. Research suggests that during Charles V's reign, the Aulic Council was reformed with new councilors and presidents every time the Emperor visited the Empire. However, it is possible that councilors travelled with Charles outside the Empire in order to help with German affairs. Charles V's brother, Archduke Ferdinand (the future Emperor Ferdinand I), who served as the Habsburg "viceroy" (later King of the Romans), maintained his own council too. In 1541, the Aulic Council was consolidated into a more permanent body. It received an ordo consilii in 1550, and when Charles V abdicated, Ferdinand's council was implemented as the new Aulic Council, receiving an ordinance in 1559, and continued some of Charles's court traditions.

=== Further development of the Aulic Council ===
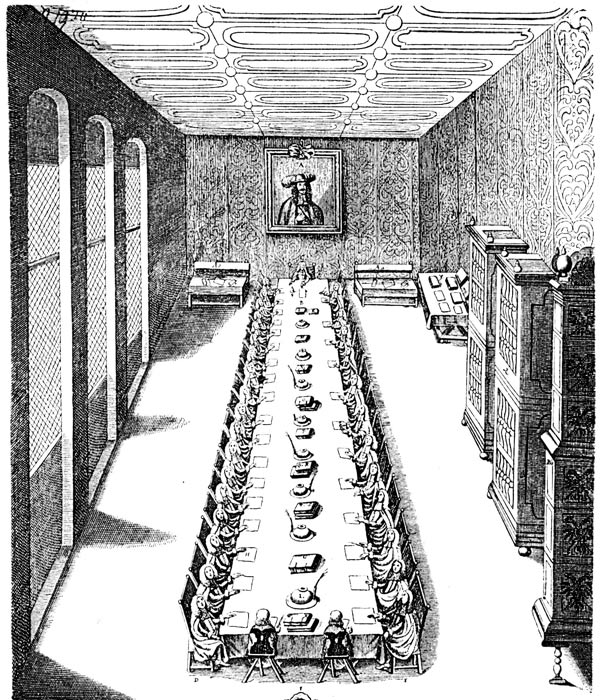
Meeting of the Aulic Council, 1683

In the late 1500s and early 1600s, particularly during Emperor Rudolf II's reign, the Aulic Council was frequently tasked to deal with conflicts that could not be settled by the Imperial Diet or by arbitration. During this time, the Aulic Council often dealt with religious disputes. The council likely sided with the Catholic side more often than not, which was critiqued by Protestant princes. The use of the Aulic Council for judicial matters also greatly increased in the late 1500s.

The relationship between the Aulic Council and the Reichskammergericht is described as both competitive but also cooperative, depending on the situation. For most cases, litigants could choose between both courts. From 1620 onward, the Aulic Council began to significantly out produce the Reichskammergericht in terms of numbers of litigations. It is also during this time the Aulic Council underwent large reforms. The court would appoint Fiskal, special attorneys (see more information in Composition section), and established advocates to represent any litigants.

The Aulic Council would further evolve thanks to the Peace of Westphalia (1648) (which rectified some of the religious issues in the council), and later Emperor Ferdinand III's new constitution for the court in 1654. The Aulic Council being faster than the Reichskammergericht, and also possessing the Emperor's direct authority, made it attractive to litigants. After Westphalia, the Aulic Council's involvement in Imperial Cities also grew (see Responsibilities: Imperial Cities section). The court played a major role during the Habsburg resurgence in the Empire under Emperor Leopold I. Historian Barbara Stollberg-Rilinger describes it as "the most important instrument that Leopold used in exercising his supreme authority."

In 1767, the Aulic Council handled 2,088 cases. This grew to 3,388 in 1779.

When Napoleon I's gains after the Battle of Austerlitz and the Peace of Pressburg culminated in the end of the Holy Roman Empire, the Aulic Council likewise ceased to exist in 1806 as an imperial institution.

=== Relationship to the Emperor ===
Though the court was often in Vienna and politically tied to the Emperor, some historians do not consider it to be strictly partisan in favor of the Emperor. A nuanced view states how Emperors after the Westphalia (1648) realized that using the Aulic Council for political means would make the court less respected, and that the courts sometimes went against the Emperor's wishes or policies. The Aulic Council attached much of its importance to legal arguments, so it sometimes contradicted the Emperor. Historian Leopold Auer states that "the interests of the [Emperor] could, of course, go against [the Aulic Council's] policy... and [create] to conflicts in which the Council might even come to conclusions different from those of the emperor himself."

=== An example of juridification and the protection of smaller Imperial estates: Brandenburg-Kulmbach v. Prussia ===
The Holy Roman Empire, even in its later years, maintained relative peace and stability. Additionally, the existence of smaller territorial princes was maintained, in spite of attempts by more powerful princes to absorb smaller ones (which later occurred during mediatisation). In this regard, the Aulic Council played a major role. Historian Siegrid Westphal demonstrated in her work that the Aulic Council played the role of a mediator in conflicts between Imperial estates. A great example of this is the Brandenburg-Kulmbach succession crisis.

Ruled by a branch of the Prussian Hohenzollern family, the small margraviate was at risk of falling into Prussian hands. Prussia had purchased the succession claim from a junior Brandenburg-Kulmbach prince, Christian Heinrich, in 1703. This led to a dispute over whether or not Christian Heinrich's son, George Frederich Karl, should have succession rights. The Prussians refused to accept George Frederich Karl's claim, and began to actively prepare the territory for a Prussian takeover following the death of the reigning Margrave, George Wilhelm.

Worried about the possibility of Prussian annexation, Kulmbach margraves appealed to the Emperor and the Elector of Mainz for protection. Imperial Vice-Chancellor, Friedrich Karl von Schönborn, petitioned the case to Emperor Charles VI, seeking to limit Prussia's growing power. To appear impartial, the case was sent to the Aulic Council. In 1716, the Aulic Council declared that the Prussian purchase of the Kulmbach succession claim was invalid, and went against the succession customs of the Hohenzollerns. The Aulic Council stated that the transfer of claims was made during a time of duress (War of the Spanish Succession). A Kulmbach envoy is reported to have said have commented "'at least in Germany we no longer have to rely on weapons, but on due process, which gives the weaker estates cause to rejoice." Prussia complied with the Aulic Council's demands, and the crisis in Kulmbach was settled without further trouble.

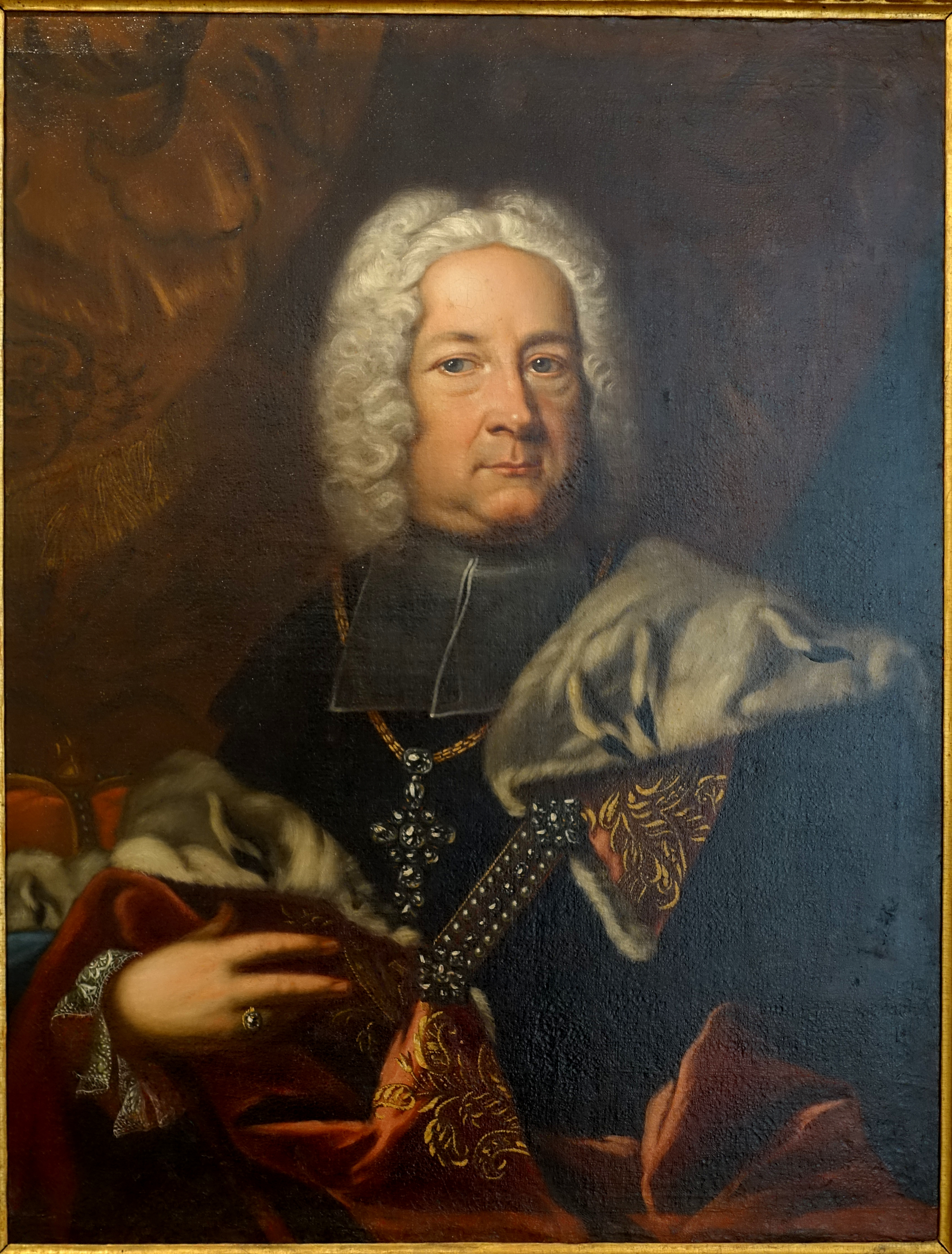
Friedrich Karl von Schönborn, Vice-Chancellor of the Holy Roman Empire, played a major role in the proceedings of the Aulic Council during the reign of Emperor Charles VI

Even though Kulmbach was receiving Imperial protection, it, alongside other princes like the Duchy of Württemberg, had been trying to suppress the rights of the Imperial knights, which were being protected by the Emperor. This shows how the Emperor could intervene on multiple layers of hierarchy: the Emperor was protecting the margrave from Prussia, but also protecting the Imperial knights against the margraves.

This was far from the only case where the Aulic Council defended the rights of weaker Imperial estates against larger ones. Leopold Auer writes that "the Imperial Aulic Council guaranteed the continuity and stability of the complex constitutional structure of the Old Reich by protecting the less powerful members of the Empire against the threats posed by the bigger Estates." Further examples can be found in the Examples of Cases Settled section.

== Composition ==
=== President ===
The president of the Aulic Council was a nobleman, often a count. They did not necessarily have legal training, but did have experience in politics and diplomacy. The president moderated sessions and took part in voting. His vote was a tiebreaker. He was appointed by the Emperor. There was also a vice president.

=== Vice Chancellor ===
The Vice Chancellor, who was appointed by the Elector of Mainz in his capacity as Imperial archchancellor, held sway in the Aulic Council.

=== Councillors ===
Each Emperor summoned a new Council upon his accession to the throne. The court normally consisted of 10-25 members, though this fluctuated over time. Under pressure from the Imperial Diet, the number of Protestants and Catholics on the council were balanced by Ferdinand III in 1654. Upon the death of an Emperor, the council was dissolved and had to be reconstructed by his successor. The Emperor was responsible for paying the councillors.

The council was divided into two benches: The Lords' Bench (Herrenbank), mainly consisting of councillors recruited from the nobility, and the Knights' and Scholars' Bench (Ritter- und Gelehrtenbank). Both benches decided as one body. Councillors generally had legal qualifications, and their votes held the same weight.

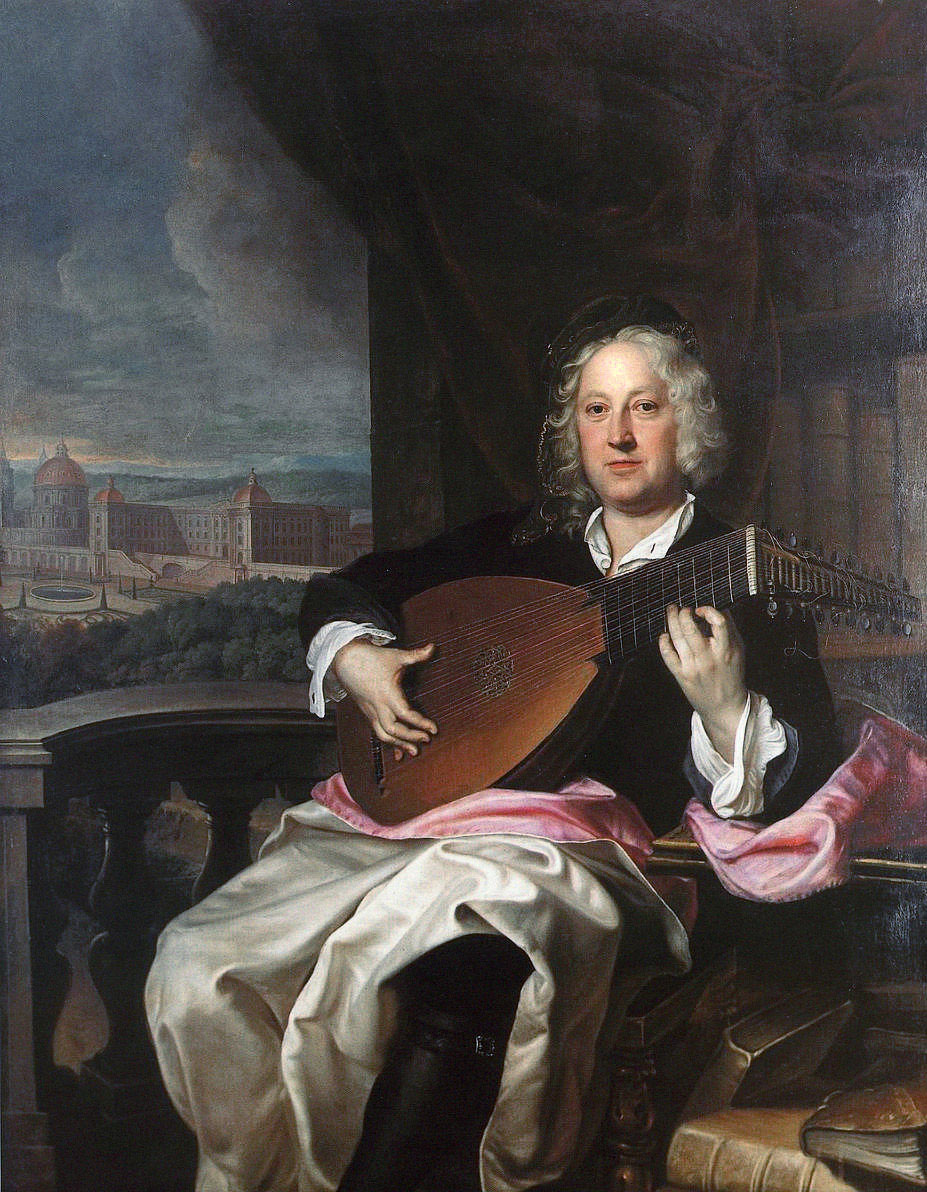
Aulic Councilor Johann Adam von Questenberg with lute. However, Questenberg did not have an extensive legal background. In 1712, Questenberg’s colleague Nikolaus Christoph von Lyncker accused him of passing the time at sessions reading French novels.

Councilors often had professional experience in Habsburg governance, worked in estates closely tied to the Emperor, or served on the Reichskammergericht.

=== Fiskal ===
The Fiskal (also spelled Fiskale), were special attorneys that represented Imperial interests. They often came from amongst officials in either the Aulic Council, the Reichskanzlei (Imperial Chancellery), or Austria below the Enns River.

=== Other ===
The court also employed numerous lawyers, attorneys, procurators, and scribes.

== Decision-making and enforcement ==
The court made decisions based on majority vote, and transcriptions were written in German or Latin. Proceedings were not comparatively formal, less so than the Reichskammergericht, and instead aimed to resolve conflict amicably. Rulings were not appealable in court, and decisions could only be challenged by appealing to the Emperor, or later, the Imperial Diet. In cases where the court was in doubt, it could contact the Emperor for help with decision-making (votum ad imperatorem). In particular, cases that immense political sensitivity would be sent to the Emperor and his privy-conference (Geheime Konferenz) for recommendations. The privy-conference in particular was prone to political polarization. Three key factions, the Reichskanzlei, the Austrian Hofkanzlei (Court-Chancellery), and the Spanish Council, all fought over influence in the Austrian Habsburg court. During Emperor Charles VI's reign, these factions often went against each other. To mitigate this and create some coordination, the president of the Aulic Council was often part of the privy-conference when Aulic Council cases were under investigation.

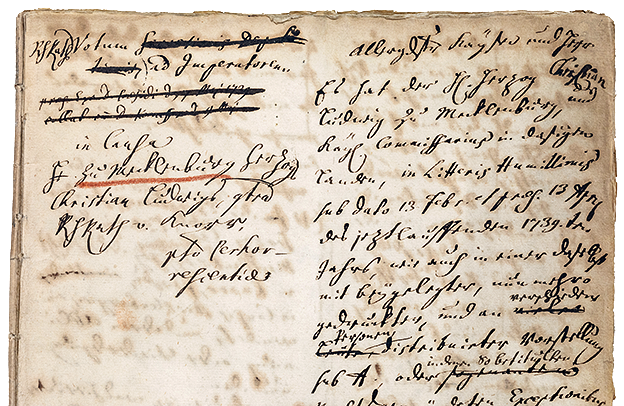
Votum ad Imperatorem (see top left) in a 1739 Aulic Council court case pertaining the Duke of Mecklenburg

The Imperial Aulic Council often emphasized mediation over formal verdicts. It frequently employed "commissions" to facilitate compromises between parties, and sometimes the act of filing a complaint with the Council was sufficient to encourage settlement. Both the Aulic Council and the Reichskammergericht demonstrated their moderating influence in witch trials: both courts tried to (and with some success managed to) prevent excessive cruelty in the proceedings.

When required, the Aulic Council had a formalized method of issuing verdicts, mainly through use of military force, and enlisted help from "commissions" consisting of princes in Imperial Circles. Such enforcement was legitimized by the Emperor. The Aulic Council could enforce many of its verdicts, even against stronger members of the Empire (ex. Prussia), without using force, to the extent that Frederick William I of Prussia, the famous "Soldier King", partook in bribing members of the Aulic Council in hopes of securing more favorable verdicts, to avoid being contumacious. These enforcement and arbitration mechanisms all helped establish the principle of juridification in the Empire.

== Responsibilities ==
The Aulic Council handled both judicial and political matters, and the distinction between both is not always easy to make. The Aulic Council did not try to make a distinction between the two, calling all of its cases causae.

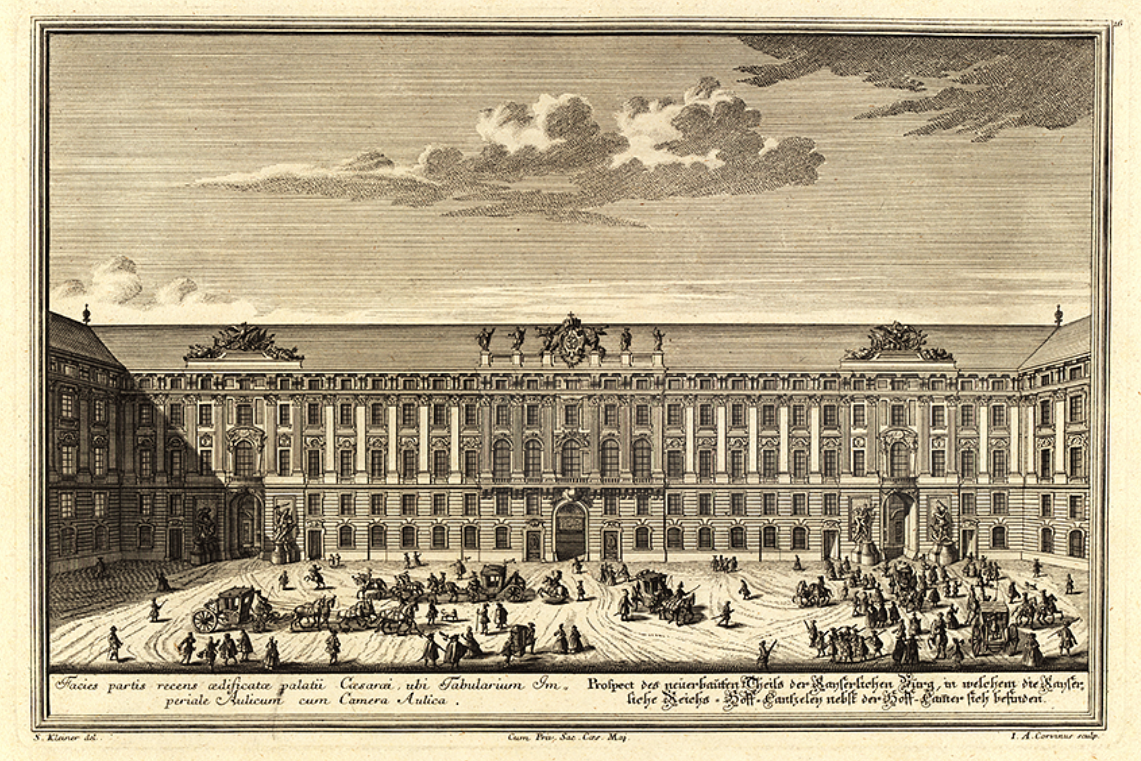
Reichskanzlei Wing of the Hofburg: the Aulic Council was located here

During the reigns of Charles V and Ferdinand I, the Aulic Council focused primarily on acts of grace (gratialia or Gnadensachen), which encompassed granting privileges, exercising imperial rights in both secular and religious spheres, issuing pardons, and handling intervention petitions. This emphasis on acts of grace made the emperor an essential partner for all social groups within the Empire while providing him with diverse means of wielding influence.

Like the Reichskammergericht, the Aulic Council was an appeals court, in which matters that could not be settled at a lower level were brought to the it for deliberation.

The Aulic Council commonly dealt with feudal disputes. These included "imperial overlordship, protecting imperial fiefs, all issues relating to investitures, inheritance, pawning, or purchase of fiefs, and all sorts of lawsuits related to these matters." The Aulic Council also dealt with constitutional disputes, especially in Imperial cities and imperial knightly territories. It also proved to be a major court when it came to succession disputes within the Empire. For example, the Aulic Council was charged with dealing with cases such as the Jülich Succession and the succession in the Ernestine duchies. Internal conflicts between rulers and their subjects were also commonly brought to the Aulic Council. See the Examples of Cases Studied section below for more information. Uniquely, the Aulic Council also had exclusive rights over judicial matters in the Kingdom of Italy.

The Aulic Council was also often concerned with private law. It often heard economic disputes, disputes over sovereign rights, disputes between princes and provincial diets, and disputes between landowners and subjects. In addition to the aforementioned responsibilities, the Aulic Council also dealt with house pacts and family disputes. An example of this is the Nassau Family Pact, which was submitted to review by the Aulic Council. The court processed also imperial privileges, issuing letters of safe conduct, passage, and protection, granted legitimation of bastard children, and confirmed various contracts and wills.

The Aulic Council was meant to serve as a supreme court for the Habsburg crownlands, but by the end of the 17th century, this was no longer the case, so most cases came from elsewhere in the Empire. An exception to this were Jewish litigations, who were protected by the Emperor and as such could petition their complaints to the council, even if in the Habsburg crownlands. Oftentimes, Jewish businessmen would use the Aulic Council to sue princes for nonpayment of debts.

=== Debit Commission ===
The Aulic Council also possessed the right to watch over finances of princes and deal with maladministration through the Debit Commission (Debitkommissionen). The court had the right to prevent princes or free cities from taking too much debt, by holding the power to authorize large loans (though this was often bypassed). If a prince defaulted, the council could appoint a commission that would take over the governing of the land until the debt was repaid. In this time, the prince would be granted a pension. This was probably tolerated by the imperial princes since it enhanced their credit amongst lenders. Through its management of princely finances, the court saved many noble houses from financial ruin, such as the Dukes of Saxe-Hildburghausen.

=== Free cities ===
The Aulic Council frequently intervened in the constitutions of Imperial Cities. Before and during the 30 Years' War, Emperors used the Aulic Council to achieve religious peace in the cities. This meant compromising municipal governments. The Peace of Westphalia changed this, by making the compromises unnecessary (by establishing religious status-quo), and this led to city citizens addressing many complaints to the Aulic Council. During Charles VI's reign, with guidance from Vice-Chancellor Schönborn, Imperial policy was attempting to make the administration in the Imperial Cities more uniform, and to tie them closer to the Emperor. Examples of such include Aulic Council verdicts pertaining to constitutional conflict in Frankfurt and Augsburg, which restricted the power of city governments in favor of the citizens. Leopold Auer states that this caused the Aulic Council to function almost like a "constitutional high court."

=== Protection of civilian rights ===
The Aulic Council and the Reichskammergericht both protected the rights of the people against local governments. The court's power could even bypass the Privilegium de non appellando, if the litigants could credibly show that they had been denied due process. Low funds and low social status did not hamper one from appealing to the court, as the Aulic Council was required to provide counsel free of charge (the Reichskammergericht had a similar establishment). Peasants often sought audiences with the Emperor, with some travelling from distant parts of the Empire. The Emperor would generally give a formulaic response: "You shall have justice" (Euch wird Recht werden), before turning over the case to the Aulic Council.

The Aulic Council was not an unconditional defender of the rights of subjects. There were occasions where it sided with an overlord.

== More examples of cases settled ==
=== Seventeenth century ===
==== Jülich-Cleves-Berg Succession Crisis ====
In 1609, a succession crisis in the United Duchies of Jülich-Cleves-Berg fell under the jurisdiction of the Aulic Council. The case was not resolved and escalated into the War of the Jülich Succession.

==== Erfurt v. Mainz ====
Between 1648 and 1664, Erfurt's magistrates attempted to secure the city's status as an imperial city. However, Erfurt was nominally subject to the Elector of Mainz. Two struggles ensued: one between Erfurt and Mainz, and another between the burghers of Erfurt and the magistrates (the burghers were concerned about their privileges). The Elector of Mainz in particular sought to use the opportunity to strengthen his control over Erfurt. In this period, the Emperor appointed four commissions to deal with the crisis, with the last three commissions all including members of the Aulic Council. The appointed Aulic Councilor, Johann Christoph von Schmidburg, was a partisan in favor of Mainz. Erfurt was placed under Imperial Ban, and the Elector of Mainz was given the right to enforce the imperial decree. In 1664, Erfurt was subdued by Mainz for good.

=== Eighteenth century ===
==== Deposition of Prince William Hyacinth ====
Prince William Hyacinth ruled part of the small territory of Nassau-Siegen. His violent and extortionate behavior led to multiple lawsuits against him and one of his ministers, Carlo Colomba, at the Aulic Council. The Aulic Council commissioned the cathedral chapter of the Electorate of Cologne to investigate the litigations. Further bad behavior and lack of cooperation by William Hyacinth, along with an alleged violation of the Constitutio Criminalis Carolina, led to armed intervention in his lands, and later his deposition in 1707. The court's mandates were "promptly executed by Electoral Cologne." Later, the lands would pass into the administration of the local Imperial Circle, which had already been cooperating with the Aulic Council.

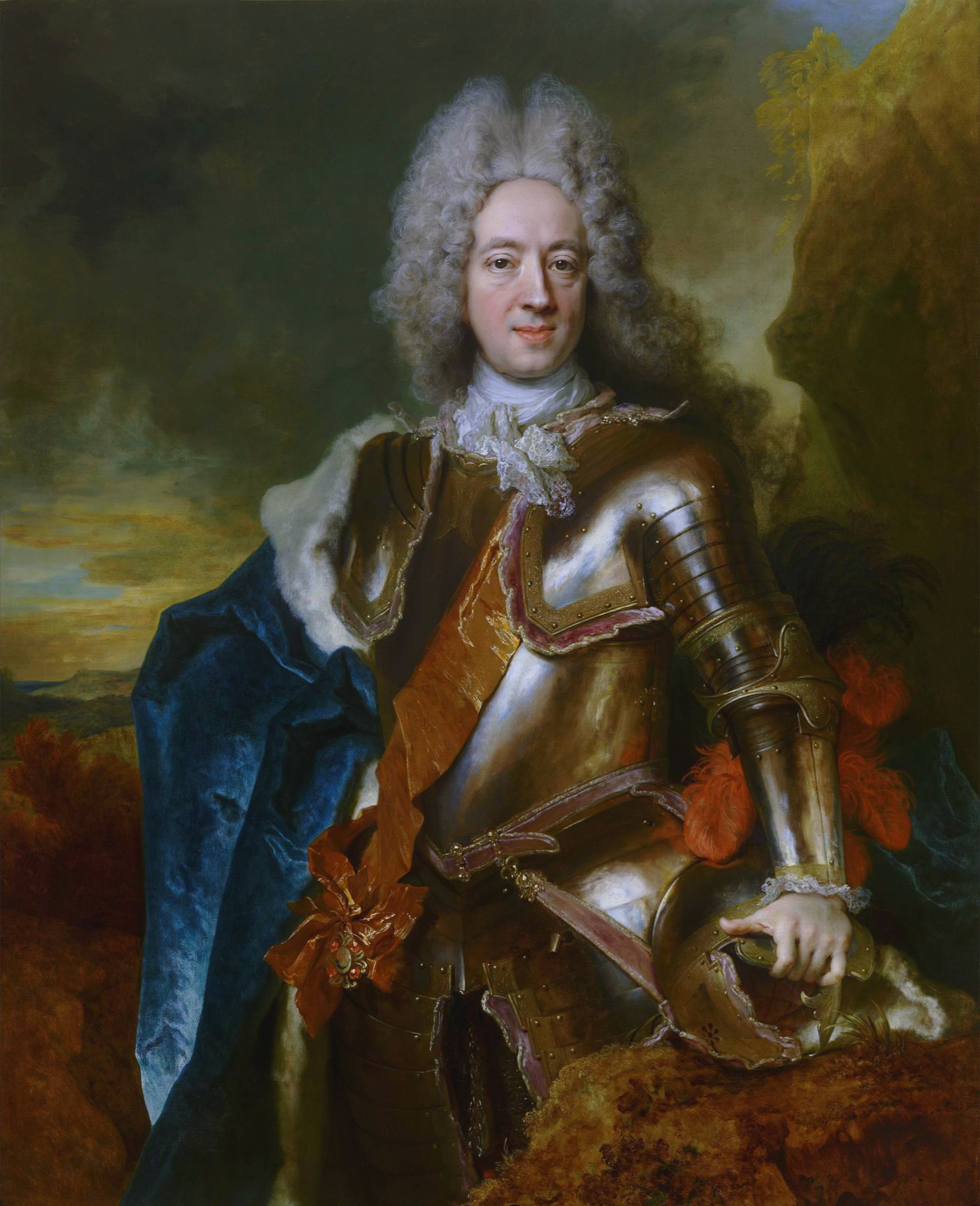
Prince William Hyacinth of Nassau-Siegen

==== Limpurg Succession Crisis ====
When the Count of Limpurg (not to be confused with Limburg) died without heirs in 1713 without male heirs, Prussia occupied the territory. The widowed countess appealed to the Aulic Council, in hopes of restoring the autonomy of Limpurg. The prince-bishops of Bamberg and Würzburg, along with the Duke of Württemberg, formed a commission, and the countess requested that "in case good offices are employed to no avail, [the commissioners] should employ armed force to drive the Prussian invaders out of the Limpurg territories". The Prussians promptly withdrew from Limpurg, and the countess was restored to her lands.

==== Uncovered fraud of Rheingraf Karl Magnus ====
Rheingraf Karl Magnus of Grehweiler contracted large loans by forging the consent of his subjects. He used these funds to pay for his construction projects. When his fraud was uncovered, the Aulic Council sentenced him to 10 years in prison.

==== Internal disputes in Mecklenburg and Württemberg ====
Internal conflicts were often fought between princes and local estates and parliaments. Oftentimes, these were fought over taxation. A form of this occurred in Mecklenburg and Württemberg. The Aulic Council played a significant role in both cases. In Württemberg, the estates' complaints led to the emperor deposing regent Frederick Charles in 1693. Similarly, in Mecklenburg, a complaint resulted in the emperor deposing Karl Leopold in 1728. Ultimately, these conflicts ended with victories for the estates over their rulers—Mecklenburg in 1755 and Württemberg in 1764/70. Similar cases also occurred in Bavaria and East Frisia.

==== Hesse-Rheinfels v. Hesse-Kassel ====
A dispute between Hesse-Rheinfels (sometimes referred to as Hesse-Rheinfels-Rotenburg or Hesse-Rotenburg) and Hesse-Kassel was fought over the Rheinfels fortress and the county of Katzenelnbogen. The lands belonged to Hesse-Rheinfels, but the fortress was occupied by the larger Hesse-Kassel in 1692 to defend it against French attacks in the Nine Years' War. Hesse-Kassel decided to retain the fortress even after the war, until the Treaty of Baden (1714), which demanded that Hesse-Kassel return the fort to Hesse-Rheinfels. Landgrave Charles of Hesse-Kassel refused, and so Hesse-Rheinfels appealed to the Emperor. The Aulic Council supported the claim of Hesse-Rheinfels, but the mandate was unable to be enforced, due to developments both within the Empire and beyond (Hesse-Kassel had support from the Dutch Republic, for example, and had marriage ties with Sweden). Eventually, in 1718, armies of the Palatinate, Mainz, and Trier, engaged in skirmishes against Hesse-Kassel. The conclusion of the Austro-Turkish War finally led to Hesse-Kassel's surrender, as it meant Imperial armies could be diverted to deal with the issue.

==== Bentheim-Tecklenburg v. Prussia and Solms-Braunfels ====
The County of Tecklenburg had been engaged in a succession dispute since the 1500s. In 1686, the Reichskammergericht issued a verdict which settled the conflict, splitting the territory between Bentheim-Tecklenburg and Solms-Braunfels. In 1696, Solms-Braunfels ceded their claim to Brandenburg-Prussia. When Prussia and Solms-Braunfels occupied Tecklenburg in 1701, Bentheim-Tecklenburg appealed to the Aulic Council. The conflict escalated when Solms-Braunfels formally sold Tecklenburg to Prussia. The Aulic Council declared this sale illegal. Prussia's activity was condemned by members of the Lower Rhenish–Westphalian Circle, in particular Münster and the Palatinate. At the Imperial Diet of 1722, Prussia, Solms-Braunfels, and the Reichskammergericht, challenged the Aulic Council's decision. Prussia claimed that since the Reichskammergericht had already reached a verdict on the case, the Aulic Council should have never reopened the case. The Aulic Council argued that the Reichskammergericht was not authorized to pass verdicts on disputed immediate Imperial estates, but the Reichskammergericht responded by claiming that Tecklenburg was not a county immediate to the Emperor, but only an allodial property. The case was unable to be settled in the diet.

The Aulic Council continued to publish verdicts against Prussia throughout 1725, but failure of the council to enforce the case, coupled with the Emperor needing Prussia support with the Pragmatic Sanction, led to a 1729 treaty between Prussia and Bentheim-Tecklenburg. Bentheim-Tecklenburg would give up its claim to Tecklenburg, but would receive 750,000 Reichstaler. The Emperor ratified the treaty in 1730, and Prussia annexed Tecklenburg.

The Tecklenburg case is an example of the Aulic Council somewhat going against Habsburg policy. Despite the Emperor Charles VI attempting to "woo" Prussia in exchange for agreeing to the Pragmatic Sanction, the Aulic Council remained steadfast in challenging Prussia's position in Tecklenburg.

==== Knights of the Göler v. Electoral Palatinate ====
Zwingenberg, a fief of the Electoral Palatinate, had been ruled by the lords of Hirschhorn, which fell extinct in 1632. According to a succession treaty in the Peace of Westphalia, the territory was meant to pass to the knights of the Göler. Instead, the Elector Palatine, Charles III Phillip, granted the land to the Wiser family. In 1725, the Aulic Council ordered the Elector Palatine to restore Zwingenberg to the Göler.

Diplomatic developments in Europe complicated matters. The Peace of Vienna, and the subsequent Treaty of Hanover, created two new alliances in the continent, which established a new balance of power. Both parties wanted to ally with the powerful German princes: the Palatinate was being courted by Vienna. In 1726, an alliance was agreed upon between the Emperor and the Palatinate, with the Elector Palatine receiving subsidies and support in the Jülich-Berg succession.

Nonetheless, the Aulic Council remained hostile against the Palatinate when it came to the Zwingenberg case. The Swabian circle, was commissioned to eject the Elector-Palatine, but the Emperor did not immediately execute the order by 1727. The Palatinate appealed to the Imperial Diet, with support from the Catholic princes, but with relations between the Elector Palatine and the Emperor deteriorating in 1728, the Emperor became impatient with the issue, and sided with the Protestant party (Corpus Evangelicorum) against the Palatinate (this came after the Emperor promised the Jülich-Berg succession to Prussia, which led to the Elector Palatine aligning himself with the Habsburgs' rivals). In 1728, an unverified report stated that a Swabian commission lawyer was jailed and beaten, and a report from the Aulic Council stated that Imperial delegates were turned away by Palatine dragoons, when attempting to enter Zwingenberg. The Aulic Council was outraged, and demanded that the Elector Palatine be reprimanded. The Elector Palatine was ordered to stop obstructing the commission and that failure to do so would result in unrest in the Empire. In 1728, the Elector Palatine finally stepped down, and the Aulic Council's demand was executed in November 1728.

== List of Presidents of the Aulic Council ==
The Presidents of the Aulic Council were :

- 1556–1559 Karl I, Count of Hohenzollern (1516–1576)
- 1559–1563 Louis III, Count of Löwenstein (1530–1611)
- 1563–1576 Philipp, Baron of Winnenburg (1538–1600)
- 1576–1581 Otto Heinrich, Count of Schwarzenberg (1535–1590)
- 1582–1594 Paul Sixt von Trautson (1548–1621)
- 1594–1596 Georg Ludwig, Landgrave of Leuchtenberg (1563–1613)
- 1601–1604 Georg Ludwig, Landgrave of Leuchtenberg (2nd term)
- 1606–1609 Georg Ludwig, Landgrave of Leuchtenberg (3rd term)
- 1609–1623 Johann Georg, Prince of Hohenzollern-Hechingen
- 1623–1631 Wratislaw von Fürstenberg (1584–1631)
- 1632–1637 Johann Ernst von Fugger (1590–1639)
- 1637–1647 Johann Freiherr von der Reck (1584–1647)
- 1648–1670 Ernst II, Graf zu Oettingen-Wallerstein (1594–1670)
- 1670–1683 Johann Adolf, Prince of Schwarzenberg (1615–1683)
- 1683–1708 Wolfgang IV, Graf zu Oettingen-Wallerstein (1626–1708)
- 1708–1713 Rupert von Bodman (1646–1728), Prince-abbot of Kempten
- 1713–1727 Ernst Friedrich von Windisch-Graetz (1670–1727)
- 1728–1740 Johann Wilhelm von Wurmbrand-Stuppach (1670–1750)
- 1742–1742 Heinrich Karl Graf Ostein (1693–1742)
- 1744–1745 Johann Jakob Truchsess von Waldburg-Zeil († 1750)
- 1745–1750 Johann Wilhelm von Wurmbrand-Stuppach, 2nd term
- 1751–1778 Ferdinand Bonaventura II von Harrach (1708–1778)
- 1778–1791 Johann Hugo II von Hagen (1707–1791)
- 1791–1801 Wolfgang Christoph Graf Überacker (1736–1801)
- 1801–1806 Philipp Karl von Oettingen-Wallerstein (1759–1826)
