= František Adam Míča =

Czech composer and jurist

Jan Adam František Míča (11 January 1746 – 19 March 1811) was a Czech composer, jurist, and nephew of the kapellmeister František Václav Míča.

Míča was born in Jaroměřice nad Rokytnou, Bohemia. He was a prolific composer who produced numerous operas, symphonies, violin concertos, and eight string quartets. Míča grew up in Moravia and moved with his father to Vienna, where he studied law and befriended the younger Mozart and was well-regarded by the Emperor Joseph II. Upon completion of his studies in 1767, he took up a government post and joined the imperial orchestra. During a trip to Lviv in Ukraine in his capacity as a government official, he was arrested during the Polish invasion and imprisoned for six months. He died in Vienna, aged 65. Much of his music remains neglected and in manuscript form in Austrian and Czech archives.
