= Privilegium de non appellando =

Privilege of some states in the Holy Roman Empire

Within the Holy Roman Empire, the privilegium de non appellando (privilege of not appealing) was a privilege that could be granted by the emperor to an imperial estate. It limited the right of an estate's subjects to appeal cases from territorial courts to either of the imperial supreme courts, the Imperial Chamber Court (Reichskammergericht) or the Imperial Aulic Council (Reichshofrat). The privilege itself could be limited (limitatum) or unlimited (illimitatum). When unlimited, it effectively turned the highest territorial court into a court of last resort.

The privilege was highly prized by imperial estates, both because it lent prestige and because it furthered the integration of their administration by cutting off their judiciary from the rest of the Empire. Between the 16th and 18th century, virtually all the larger estates received the privilege. Almost all the Habsburg lands also had the privilege.

Even the unlimited privilege was not in fact absolute. It did not apply when a subject was given no recourse to territorial courts (refusal of justice, Rechtsverweigerung) or when a ruler refused to implement a court decision (delay of justice, Rechtsverzögerung). In such cases the subject could go to an imperial court.

== Bibliography ==
- Eisenhardt, Ulrich (1980). Die kaiserlichen Privilegia de non appellando. Cologne: Böhlau.
- Gagliardo, John G. (1980). Reich and Nation: The Holy Roman Empire as Idea and Reality, 1763–1806. Bloomington, IN: Indiana University Press.
- Oestmann, Peter (2010). "Rechtsverweigerung im Alten Reich". Zeitschrift der Savigny-Stiftung für Rechtsgeschichte: Germanistische Abteilung. 127: 51–141. doi:10.7767/zrgga.2010.127.1.51. S2CID 180393334.
- Oestmann, Peter (2018). "Court Records as Sources for the History of Commercial Law: The Oberappellationsgericht Lübeck as a Commercial Court (1820–1879)". In Heikki Pihlajamäki; Albrecht Cordes; Serge Dauchy; Dave De ruysscher (eds.). Understanding the Sources of Early Modern and Modern Commercial Law: Courts, Statutes, Contracts, and Legal Scholarship. Leiden: Brill Nijhoff. pp. 364–385.
- Stodolkowitz, Stefan Andreas (2014). "Rechtsverweigerung und Territorialjustiz. Verfahren wegen iustitia denegata vel protracta am Oberappellationsgericht Celle". Zeitschrift der Savigny-Stiftung für Rechtsgeschichte: Germanistische Abteilung. 131: 128–181. doi:10.7767/zrgga-2014-0107. S2CID 180940772.
