= Reichskammergericht =

One of the two supreme courts of Holy Roman Empire (1495-1806)

Coordinates: 50°33′19″N 8°30′05″E

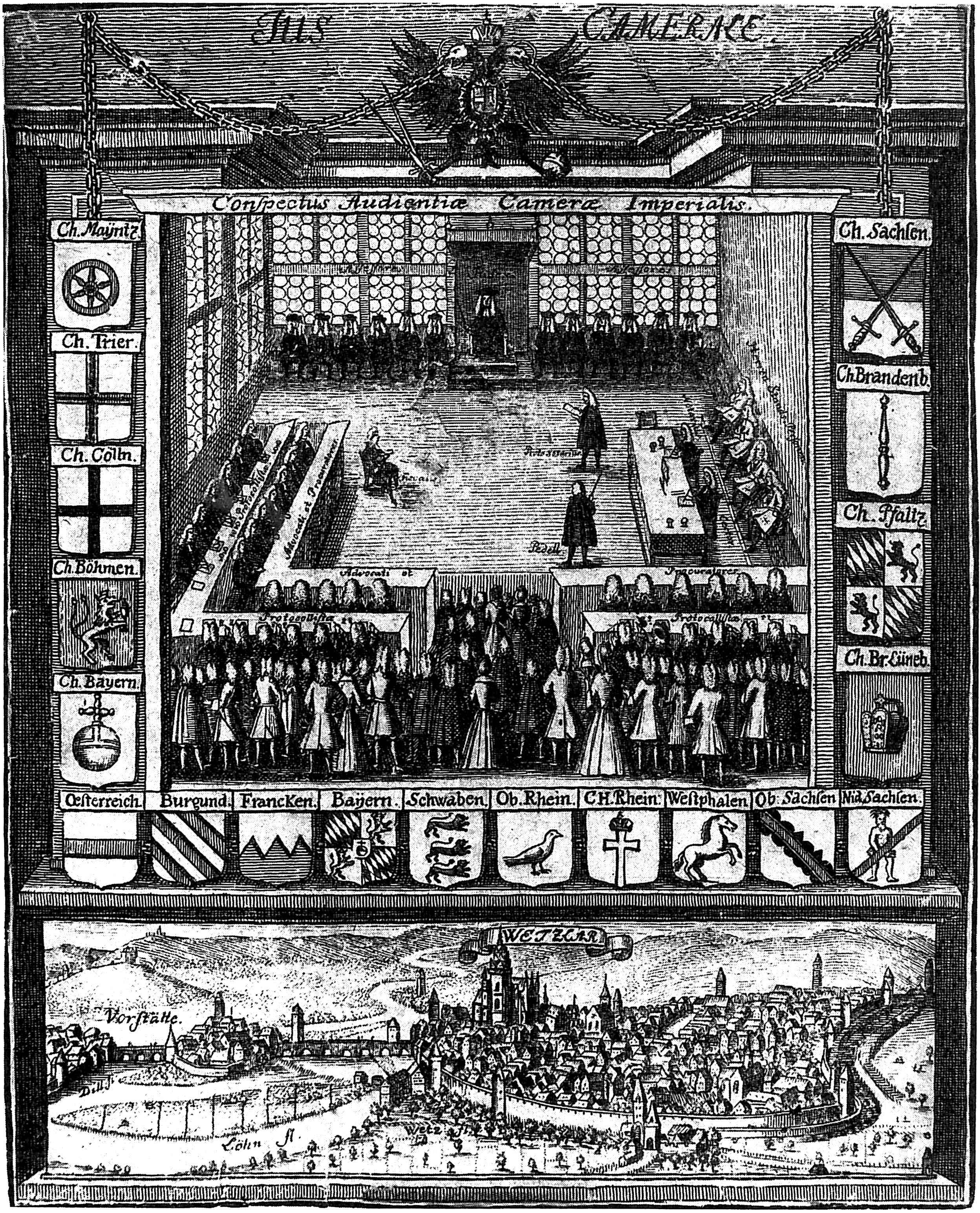
Session of the Imperial Chamber Court in Wetzlar, 1750

The Reichskammergericht (German for 'Imperial Chamber Court'; German: [ˈʁaɪçs.kamɐɡəˌʁɪçt]; Latin: Iudicium imperii) was one of the two highest judicial institutions in the Holy Roman Empire, the other one being the Aulic Council in Vienna. It was founded in 1495 by the Imperial Diet in Worms. All legal proceedings in the Holy Roman Empire could be brought to the Imperial Chamber Court, except if the ruler of the territory had a so-called privilegium de non appellando, in which case the highest judicial institution was found by the ruler of that territory (though the privilege could be bypassed if a litigant could claim they had been denied due process). Another exception was criminal law in which the Imperial Chamber Court could intervene only if basic procedural rules had been violated.

The Imperial Chamber Court was infamous for the long time that it took to reach a verdict. Some proceedings, especially in lawsuits between different states of the Empire, took several hundred years. Some of the lawsuits had not been brought to an end when it was dissolved in 1806 following the downfall of the Holy Roman Empire. However, it has lately been discovered that it could often be attributed to a loss of interest on the part of the parties involved, and that the court was sometimes much more efficient than previously thought. Sometimes, the court even ordered injunctions within a few days.

Recent research has also brought to light that especially in the 18th century, the rulings of the court anticipated in many ways the constitutional establishment of civil liberties in Germany. For instance, the inviolability of one's housing or freedom of trade was legally introduced in the Empire by rulings of the court. In the late 18th century, some contemporaries even compared the Imperial Chamber Court to the National Assembly in Revolutionary France.

== History ==
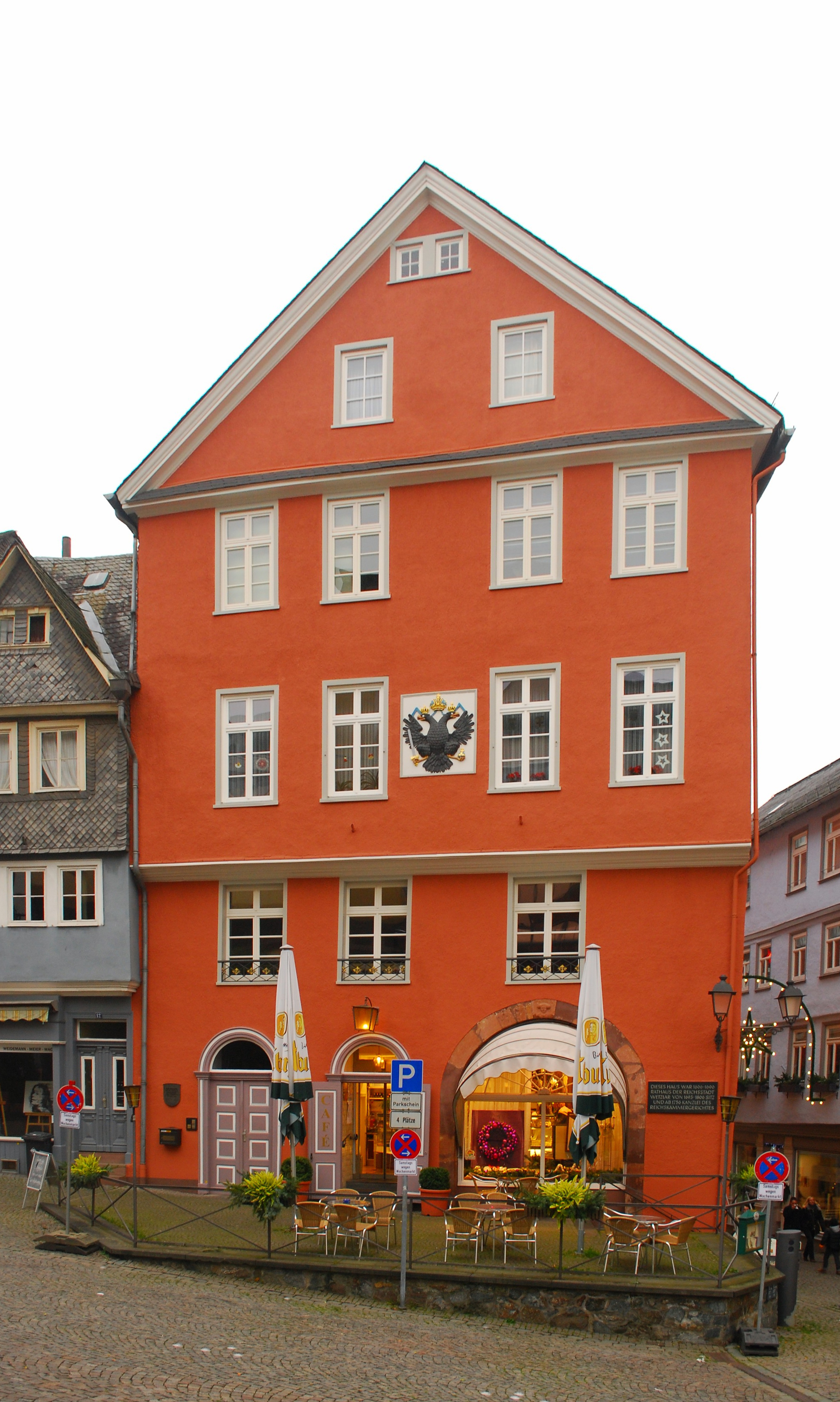
Imperial Chamber Court building in Wetzlar, 2014

At its foundation, the Imperial Chamber Court was seated in Frankfurt. It was later moved to Worms, Augsburg, Nürnberg, Regensburg, Speyer, Esslingen, Speyer again (from 1527 to 1689), and finally to Wetzlar until it was dissolved in 1806.

From the early Middle Ages, there had been a supreme court for the Empire, the Hofgericht, in which the Emperor himself presided. This court was connected directly to the Emperor, so it ceased to act when he was abroad, and it disbanded when he died. In the 15th century, the Emperor ceased to command as much respect, so his court lost the confidence of his subjects. Its place was taken by the Kammergericht.

The Emperor or a deputy presided in the Kammergericht and it was still his personal court, but the members were now officials of the Empire. It was generally the legal members of the council who sat in the Kammergericht. It fell into disuse in the later years of the reign of Frederick III. The creation of a new and efficient court became a matter of pressing necessity, and it was one of the most urgent of the reforms which were mooted in the reign of Maximilian I.

The "province of the Imperial Chamber", as it came to be gradually defined by statute and use, extended to breaches of the public peace, cases of arbitrary distraint (property seizure) or imprisonment, pleas which concerned the treasury, violations of the Emperor's decrees or the laws passed by the Imperial Diet, disputes about property between immediate tenants of the Empire or the subjects of different rulers, and finally suits against immediate tenants of the Empire, with the exception of criminal charges and matters relating to imperial fiefs, which went to the Aulic Council.

In all of its business, it suffered from the competition of the Aulic Council. The competition between the Aulic Council and the Imperial Chamber was finally regulated by the Peace of Westphalia in 1648, which laid down that the court which first dealt with a case should alone have competence to pursue it.

In 1704, failure of the princes to pay for the Reichskammergericht led to it becoming chronically understaffed. Eventually, it was suspended until 1711. As a result, the Aulic Council grew in importance and took over much of the Empire's legal matters.

Since technically anyone could appeal to the Reichskammergericht, in the 18th century, peasant appeals were extremely common. A member of the court in 1767 said that "these kinds of lawsuits [that is, complaints against rulers] have unfortunately become so frequent of late that every day whole flocks of peasants may be seen [on their way to court]". The court received 220-250 cases every year, and in the 1790s it produced more than 100 decisions each year. Though the court did not function much slower than a modern court may today, the Reichskammergericht was often overloaded. Thus, the court encouraged parties to settle cases on their own. Many times, this worked, and parties sought a compromise. Thus, the Reichskammergericht often deferred non-urgent cases until plaintiffs decided to proceed. The court did take payments from parties hoping to make their case a priority, but these were not expected and it didn't seem they affected the objectivity of the judges.

== Composition ==
The court's composition was determined by both the Holy Roman Emperor and the subject states of the Empire. The Emperor appointed the chief justice (always a highborn aristocrat), several divisional chief judges, and some of the other puisne judges. The majority of the judges were selected by the Imperial Estates. Originally, half of the judges were Knights of the Empire, and the other half were law graduates, but after 1548, all judges had to be law graduates, and the court could reject candidates that were deemed unfit.

The Peace of Westphalia in 1648 ruled that half of the members of the court must be Protestant, and called for a total of 50 judges to be appointed at any time. However, this number was not reached, as the Imperial Estates, who had to finance the court, was unwilling to pay for so many judges. After Westphalia, the court consisted of 20 judges which were divided into 2 "senates" that heard cases independently. In 1782, the number of judges went up to 28, making up 3 senates.

=== List of chief justices ===
The Chamber Judge was a member of the Imperial nobility appointed by the Emperor, who led the court personnel and represented the court externally. His task was to maintain the court's external order and distribute cases to the various assessors for processing. Initially, he also presided over the court sessions.

Nr.	Name	Period
1	Eitel Friedrich von Zollern	1495–1496
2	Jakob II von Baden	1496–1499
3	Adolf von Nassau	1500–1501
4	Wiguleus Fröschl	1503–1504, 1507–1508
–	Adolf von Nassau (2nd term)	1509–1511
5	Sigismund von Fraunberg	1512–1518
6	Adam von Beichlingen	1521–1535
7	Johann von Pfalz-Simmern	1536–1539
8	Johann von Montfort	1541–1547
9	Wilhelm Werner von Zimmern	1548–1555
10	Johann von Hoya	1556–1557
11	Michael Helding	1558–1561
12	Friedrich von Löwenstein	1562–1568
13	Marquard von Hattstein	1569–1581
14	Philipp von Winneberg	1582–1583
15	Eberhard von Dienheim	1584–1610
16	Philipp Christoph von Sötern	1611–1652
17	Wilhelm von Baden	1652–1676
18	Johann Hugo von Orsbeck	1676–1710
19	Franz Alexander von Nassau-Hadamar	1711
20	Froben Ferdinand von Fürstenberg-Mößkirch	1717–1721
21	Philipp Karl von Hohenlohe-Bartenstein	1722–1729
22	Franz Adolf Dietrich von Ingelheim	1730–1742
23	Ambrosius Franz von Virmont	1742–1744
24	Karl Philipp Franz zu Hohenlohe-Bartenstein	1746–1763
25	Franz Joseph Spaur von Pflaum und Valeur	1763–1797
26	Philipp Karl zu Oettingen-Wallerstein	1797–1801
27	Heinrich Alois von Reigersberg	1803–1806
