= Gerhard Bärsch =

German politician (born 1988)

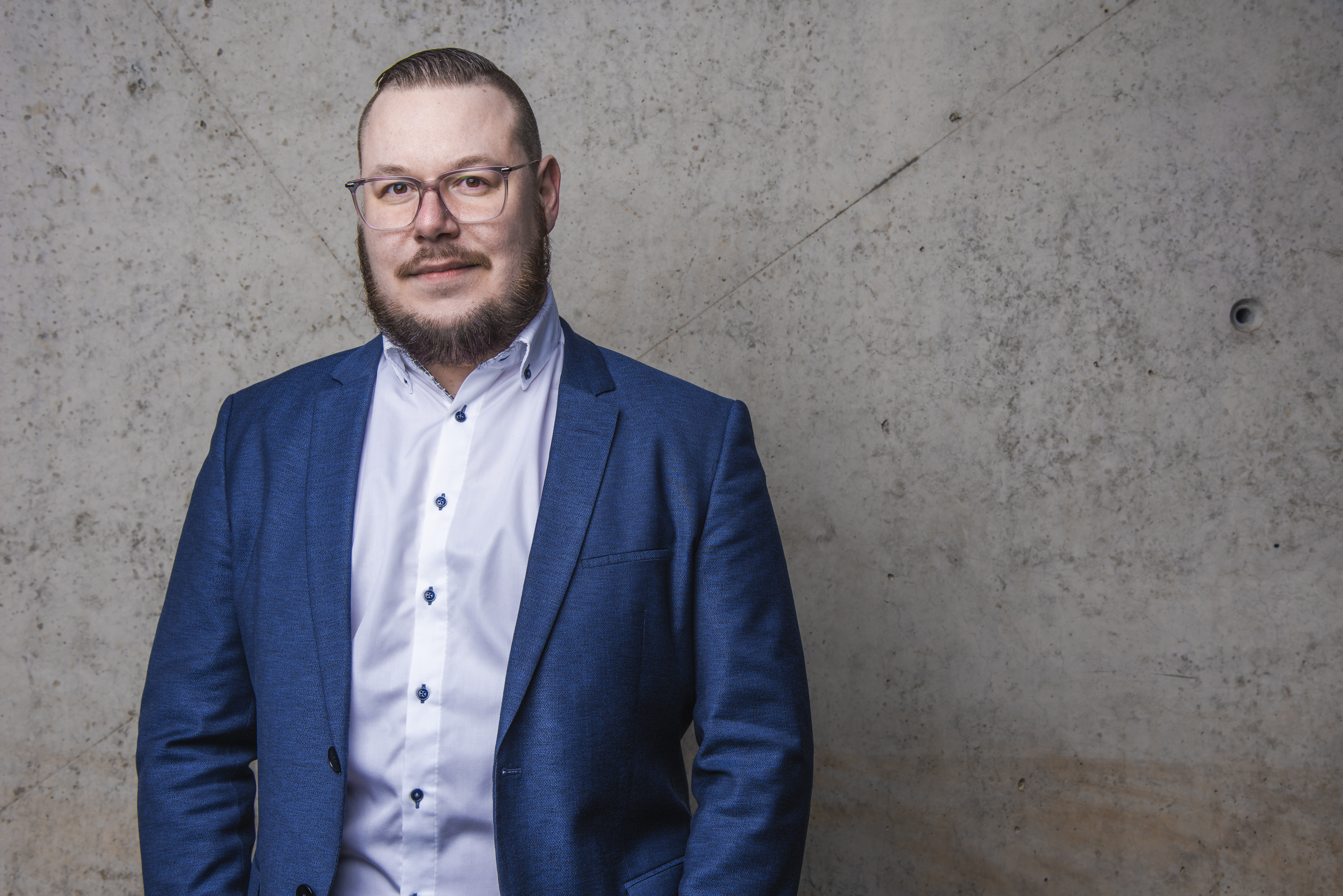
- Bärsch in 2023

Member of the Landtag of Hesse
- Incumbent
- Assumed office 18 January 2024

Personal details
- Born: 11 July 1988 (age 37) Bad Soden am Taunus
- Party: Alternative for Germany (since 2016)

Gerhard Bärsch (born 11 July 1988 in Bad Soden am Taunus) is a German politician serving as a member of the Landtag of Hesse since 2024. He has served as chairman of the Alternative for Germany in the Vogelsbergkreis since 2020.
