= Johann Adam von Questenberg =

Czech aristocrat

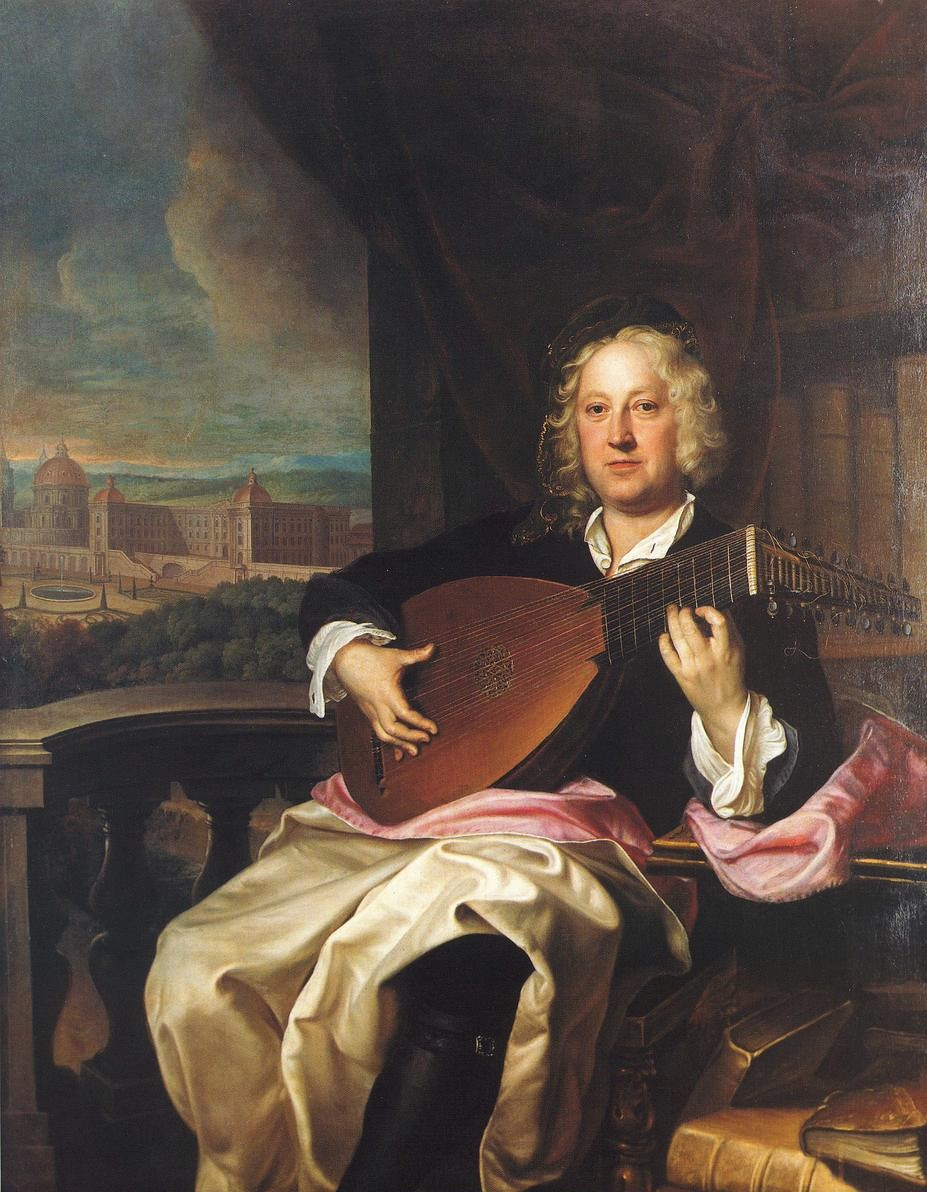
- Johann Adam von Questenberg with a Lute by Jan Kupecký (1719)
- Born: Vienna
- Baptized: 24 February 1678
- Died: 10 May 1752 (aged 74); Jarmeritz
- Education: University of Vienna; University of Prague
- Occupations: Court official; Lutenist; Patron of the arts; Composer
- Organizations: Austrian Imperial Court

Count Johann Adam von Questenberg (baptized 24 February 1678; died 10 May 1752) was an Austrian nobleman, statesman, amateur musician, and patron of the arts. He was a councilor of the Imperial Aulic Council in Vienna. He organised concerts at his palaces in Vienna and Jarmeritz, and commissioned compositions by contemporary composers. He made his palace a music centre of Central Europe.

== Biography ==
Questenberg was baptised in Vienna, as the son of Count Johann Anton (1633–1686) and his wife, Baroness Maria Katharina von Stadel (born 1641). He was coming from the Cologne branch of the noble Questenberg family. His paternal grandfather, Gerhard von Questenberg, entered the service of the Habsburgs, thereby acquiring several Herrschaften (domains) in Bohemia proper, Moravia and Lower Austria, including Jaroměřice Chateau (German: Schloss Jarmeritz). Questenberg's father chose this palace for his main residence.

Questenberg studied philosophy in Vienna (1692–1694), and jurisprudence in Prague (1694–1696). Upon graduating, he received the title of Graf (Count) in 1696. In 1702, after spending three years taking his "Grand Tour" through Europe, he came to the Aulic Council in Vienna, in the capacity of a councilor. He was promoted to Reichshofrat in 1706, becoming a Privy Councilor and Chamberlain in 1723. His Viennese palace, now known as the Questenbergpalais, and mansions were all expanded in Baroque style. His tenure at the Court ended in 1735, when Emperor Charles VI sent him to the Moravian Diet as Prinzipalkommissar (Chairman of the Imperial Commissioners – he oversaw the enforcement of the Emperor's financial demands).

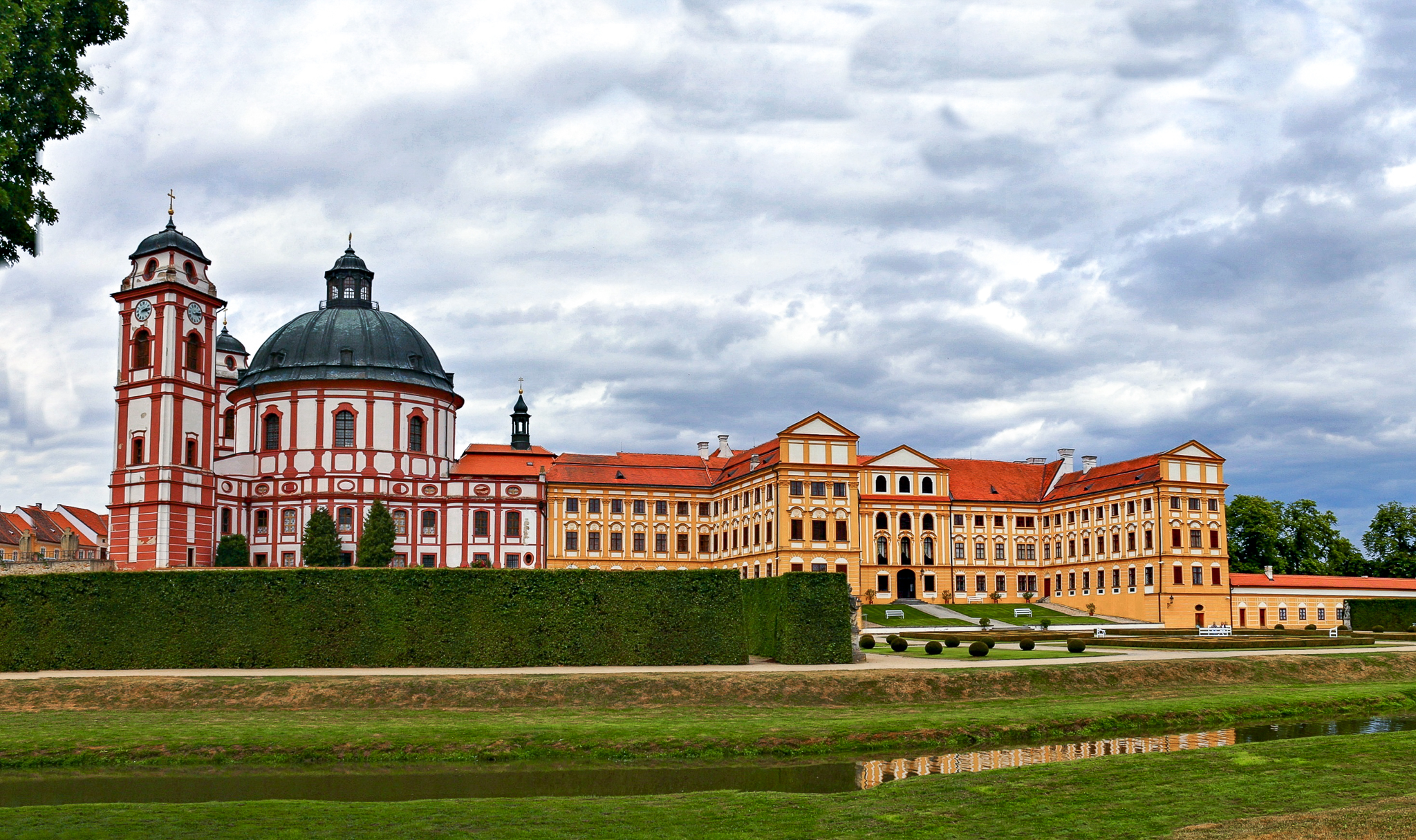
Jaroměřice (Jarmeritz) Chateau

During his stay in Vienna, he organized concerts at his palace. After 1722, he also held performances at the palace theatre in Jarmeritz. There, he maintained a permanent musical ensemble, with his own composers, twenty vocalists, and seventy instrumentalists, who also took part in church music and school concerts. By the 1730s, his palace had become a renowned music centre, not only for whole Moravia but also on a Central European scale.

Questenberg himself was an amateur composer and musician, playing the lute and theorbo; only two pieces of his have survived. He was also an enthusiastic collector of music; commissioning numerous works by contemporary composers. In addition, he maintained correspondence with Antonio Vivaldi and Johann Sebastian Bach. He may have met Bach in Karlsbad, where he had accompanied the court music director, Prince Leopold von Anhalt-Köthen, in 1718 and 1720. There is also evidence of a professional contact with Bach, through a middleman, in 1749. The Bach scholar Michael Maul suggested that Questenberg may have commissioned the Mass in B minor.

Questenberg was married twice; to Countess Maria Antonia von Waldburg-Friedburg-Scheer (1691–1736) in 1707, and to Countess Maria Antonia von Kaunitz (1708–1778) in 1738. There were six children from his first marriage, but only one daughter, Maria Carolina (1712–1750), reached adulthood. He appointed Dominik Andreas von Kaunitz, his second wife's nephew, as heir to his properties and title. He died in Jarmeritz.
