= František Antonín Míča =

Czech conductor, tenor singer and composer

František Antonín Míča (also Micza or Mitscha; 2 September 1696 – 15 February 1744) was a conductor, tenor singer and composer from Bohemia.

== Biography ==
Míča was born in Náměšť nad Oslavou. He conducted many opera performances for royal families. The most paramount example of his work is probably the opera O původu Jaroměřic (About the Origins of Jaroměřice), written in both Italian and Czech, in which he also sung the role of Gualtero.

He died in Jaroměřice nad Rokytnou.

A symphony now believed to be by his nephew František Adam Míča was once attributed to him.

== Selected works ==
- Belezza e Decoro (Libretto by Domenico Blinoni), 1729)
- Nel giorno natalizio (1732)
- Theatral Festl (1734)
- Sieben Himmels Planeten und die Vier Elemente (1734)
- Operosa terni Colossi Moles (1735)
- Krátké rozjímání (Short Meditation) (1728)
- Obviněná nevinnost (Accused Innocence) (1729)
- Oefteter Anstoss (1730)
- Abgesungene Betrachtungen (1737)
- L'origine di Jaromeritz in Moravia (1730)
