= Heinrich Alois von Reigersberg =

Bavarian lawyer and politician (1770 – 1865)

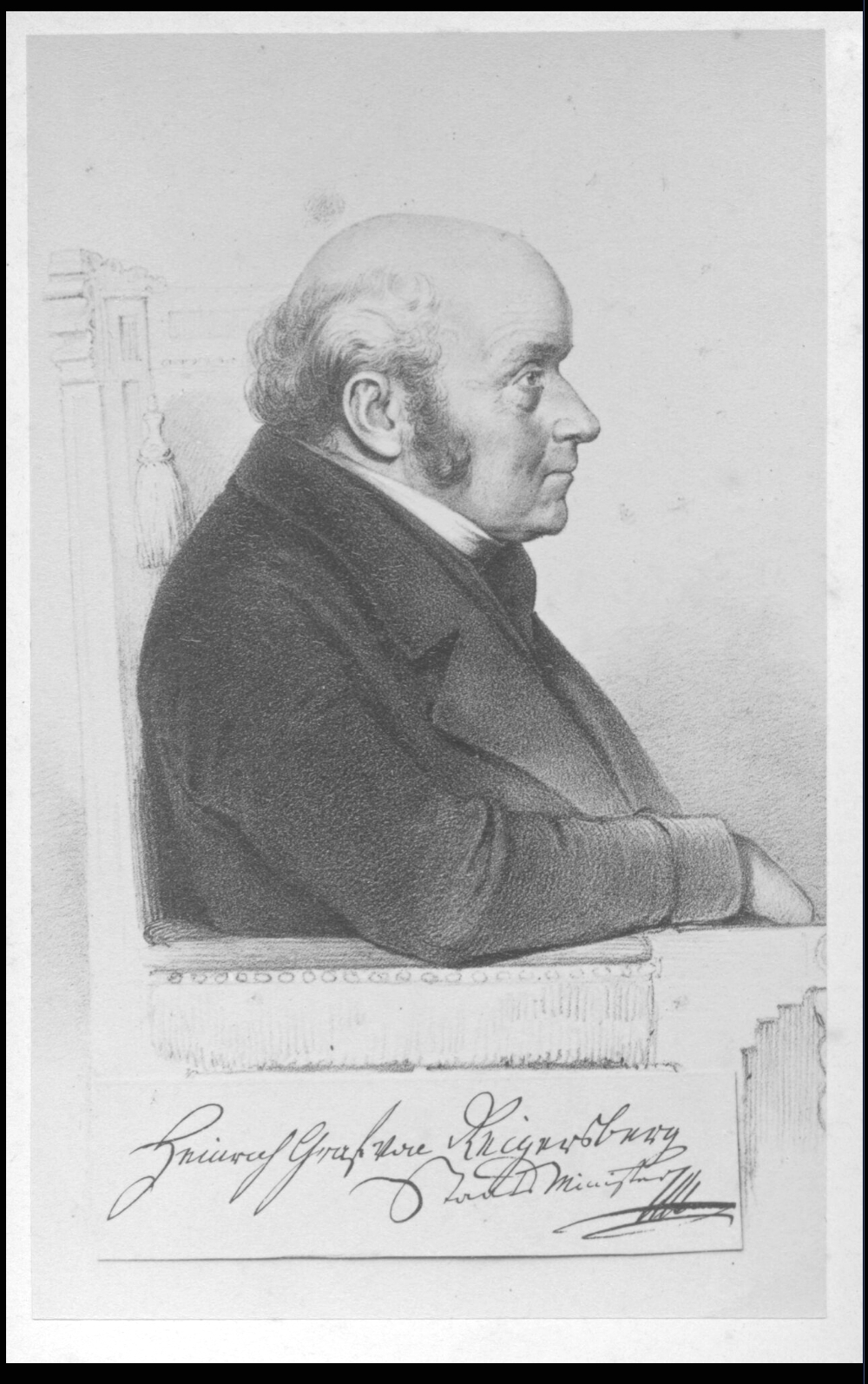
Image of Reigersberg

Franz Christoph Heinrich Alois Graf von Reigersberg (born January 30, 1770, in Würzburg; died November 4, 1865, in Munich) was a Bavarian lawyer and politician.

== Biography ==
Von Reigersberg's family was raised to the status of imperial baron in 1705 and to the status of imperial count on September 3, 1803. In 1809, he was admitted to the Bavarian nobility register as a count. In 1785, he entered the service of the Prince-Bishopric of Würzburg as a lieutenant and attended the Salzburg Page Training Institute Gregorianum from 1787 to 1790. He then studied law and political science at the University of Salzburg, the University of Bonn, and the University of Göttingen.

In 1791, he became the archbishop's chamberlain and court councilor to Hieronymus von Colloredo, Prince-Archbishop of Salzburg. From 1796 to 1797, he was Reich Chamber Court assessor (judge) of the Bavarian District in Wetzlar; from 1797 to 1803, he was Catholic Reich Chamber Court President; and from October 3, 1803, until the dissolution of the Reich Chamber Court on August 6, 1806, he was Reich Chamber Chief Judge. He was the last person to hold the highest judicial office in the Holy Roman Empire.

In 1807, he came to Munich as the Real Privy Councilor and President of the Hofgericht. In 1808, he became president of the Bavarian Higher Appeal Court and, in the same year, became an honorary member of the Bavarian Academy of Sciences. Reigersberg was one of the first three people to be awarded the Grand Cross of the newly established Order of Merit of the Bavarian Crown in 1808.

From 1810 on, he was Bavarian Minister of Justice and President of the Constitutional Commission. After the fall of Count Maximilian von Montgelas in 1817, he chaired the Council of Ministers and was therefore, alongside Foreign Minister Aloys Franz Xaver Graf von Rechberg and Rothenlöwen, the most influential politician under King Max I. However, he disappointed expectations and had to resign in 1823. Afterwards, he was Councilor of the Crown of Bavaria.

== Literature ==
- Karl Theodor von Heigel: Reigersberg, Heinrich Alois Graf von. In: General German Biography (ADB). Volume 27, Duncker & Humblot, Leipzig, 1888, p. 696 f.
- Eric O. Mader:Reigersberg, Heinrich Aloys Graf von. In: New German Biography (NDB). Volume 21, Duncker & Humblot, Berlin 2003, ISBN 3-428-11202-4, p. 329 f. (digital version).
