= Jaroměřice nad Rokytnou =

- Town
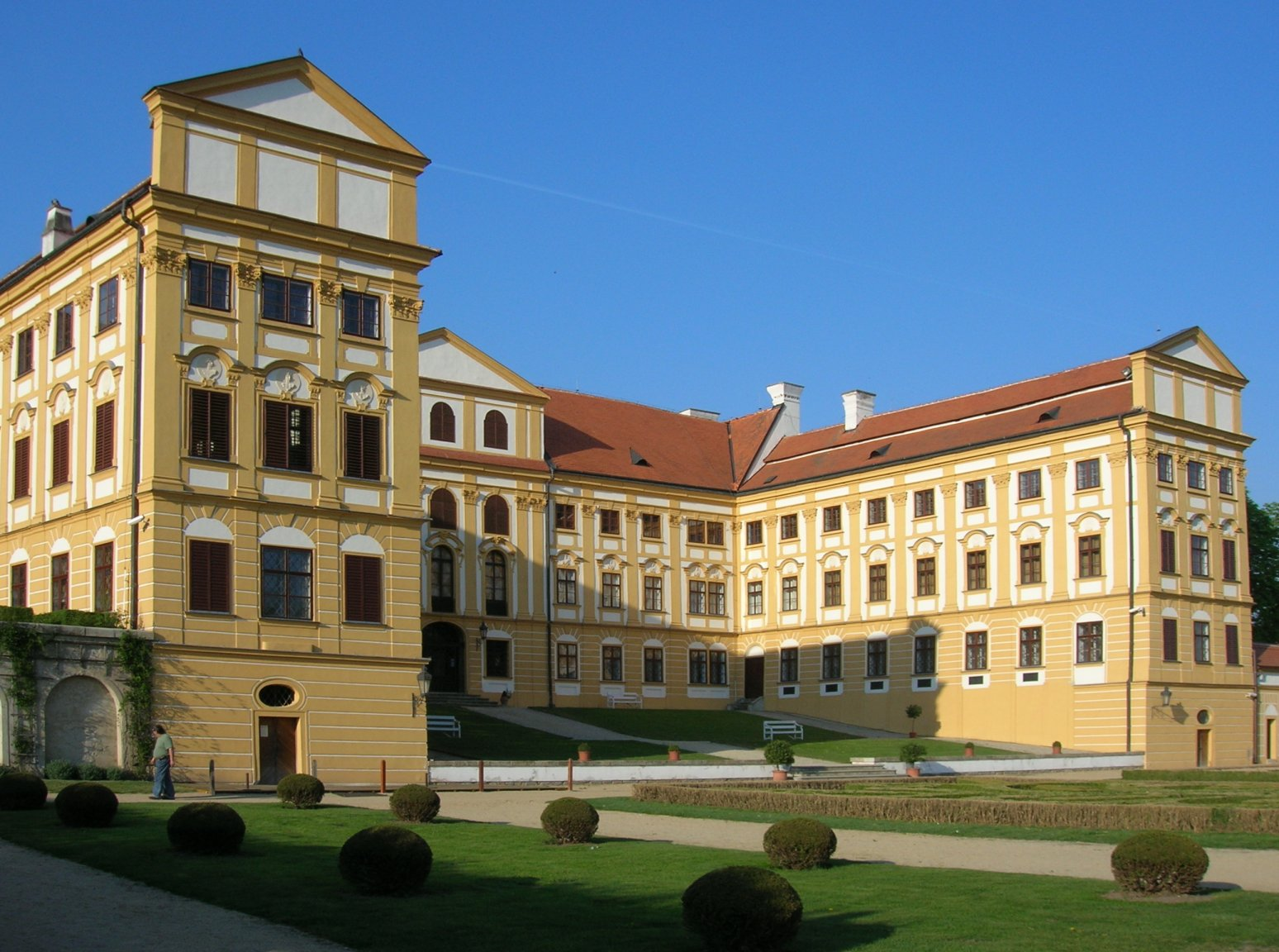
- Jaroměřice nad Rokytnou Castle

- Flag Coat of arms

- Location in the Czech Republic
- Coordinates: 49°5′39″N 15°53′36″E
- Country: Czech Republic
- Region: Vysočina
- District: Třebíč
- First mentioned: 1265

Government
  - Mayor: Karel Müller

Area
  - Total: 51.37 km^{2} (19.83 sq mi)
- Elevation: 422 m (1,385 ft)

Population (2026-01-01)
  - Total: 4,044
  - Density: 78.72/km^{2} (203.9/sq mi)
- Time zone: UTC+1 (CET)
  - Summer (DST): UTC+2 (CEST)
- Postal code: 675 51
- Website: www.jaromericenr.cz

Jaroměřice nad Rokytnou (Czech pronunciation: [ˈjaromɲɛr̝ɪtsɛ ˈnad rokɪtnou]; German: Jarmeritz) is a town in Třebíč District in the Vysočina Region of the Czech Republic. It has about 4,000 inhabitants. The town is located on the Rokytná River in the Jevišovice Uplands.

Jaroměřice nad Rokytnou is known for the Jaroměřice nad Rokytnou Castle and Church of Saint Margaret, which are protected together as a national cultural monument. The historic town centre is well preserved and is protected as an urban monument zone. The village of Boňov within the territory of Jaroměřice nad Rokytnou is protected as a village monument zone.

== Administrative division ==
Jaroměřice nad Rokytnou consists of seven municipal parts (in brackets population according to the 2021 census):

- Jaroměřice nad Rokytnou (3,041)
- Boňov (81)
- Ohrazenice (184)
- Popovice (110)
- Příložany (216)
- Ratibořice (204)
- Vacenovice (73)

== Geography ==
Jaroměřice nad Rokytnou is located about 13 kilometres (8 mi) south of Třebíč and 40 km (25 mi) southeast of Jihlava. It lies in the Jevišovice Uplands. The highest point is the hill Na Skalním at 557 m (1,827 ft) above sea level. The Rokytná River flows through the town. The Rokytka Stream joins the river on the western outskirts of the town. There are several fishponds in the municipal territory.

== History ==
According to legend, Jaroměřice was founded in 1131 by Jaromír, son of Duke Bořivoj II, and was named after him. The first written mention of Jaroměřice is in a document not older than from 1265. In 1420, the settlement was first referred to as a town.

The greatest development occurred during the rule of Count Jan Adam Questenberk in the first half of the 18th century. He had rebuilt the castle into its current form and overall improved the town. Thanks to his interest in music, the town became a cultural centre and musical tradition was born that continues to this day.

After the family of Questenberk died out in 1752, the rapidly declining estate was inherited by the Kounice family and later acquired by the Wrbna-Freudenthal family.

== Demographics ==
Historical population

Year	Pop.	±%
1869	3,891	—
1880	4,017	+3.2%
1890	4,154	+3.4%
1900	4,568	+10.0%
1910	4,801	+5.1%

Year	Pop.	±%
1921	4,857	+1.2%
1930	4,785	−1.5%
1950	4,123	−13.8%
1961	4,340	+5.3%
1970	4,136	−4.7%

Year	Pop.	±%
1980	4,064	−1.7%
1991	3,982	−2.0%
2001	4,106	+3.1%
2011	4,147	+1.0%
2021	3,909	−5.7%

Source: Censuses

== Transport ==
Jaroměřice nad Rokytnou is located on the railway line Znojmo–Okříšky.

== Culture ==
Since 1999, the annual International Music Festival of Peter Dvorský has been held in Jaroměřice nad Rokytnou.

== Sights ==
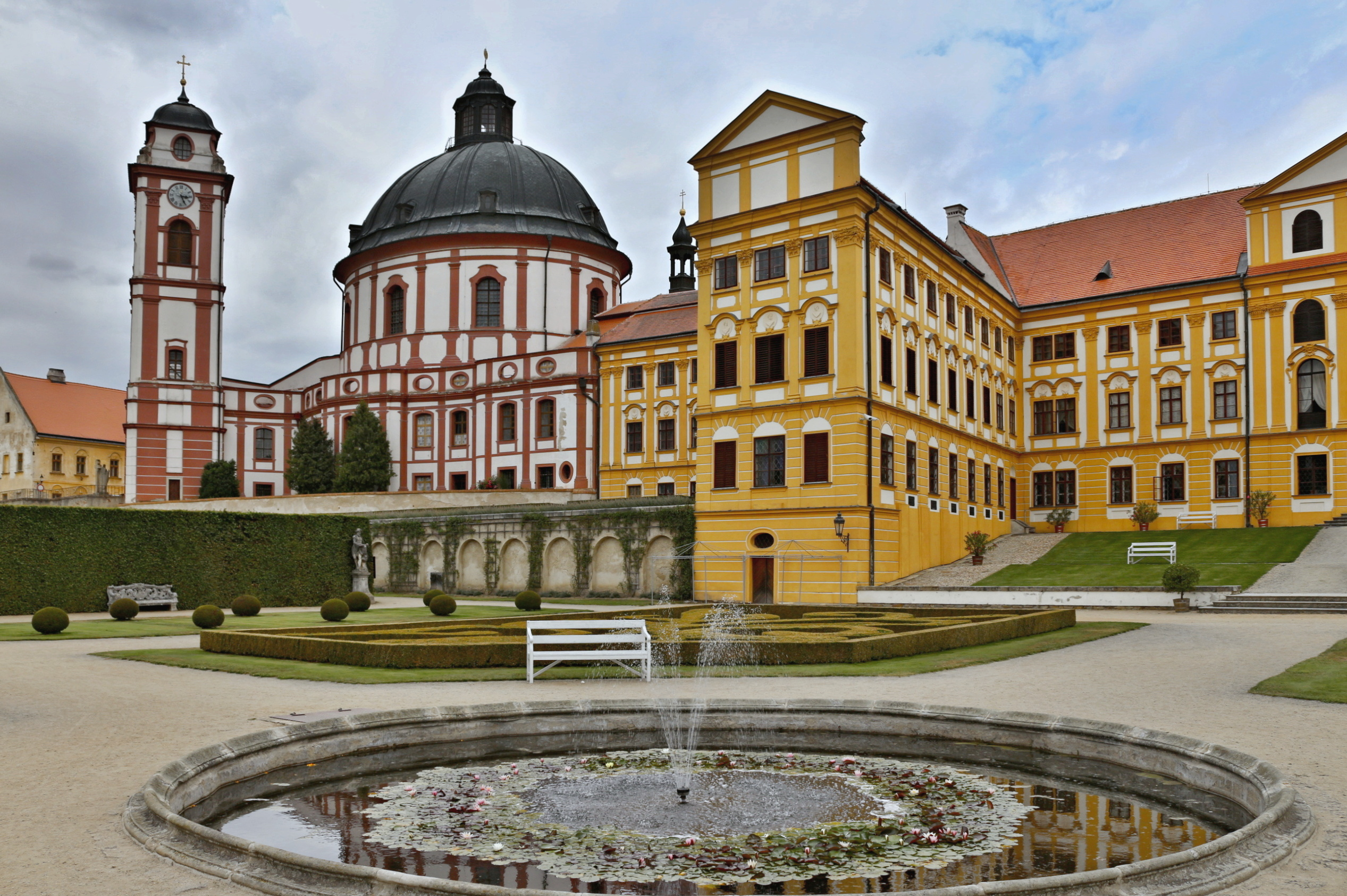
Church of Saint Margaret next to the castle

The Jaroměřice nad Rokytnou Castle is one of the main sights of the whole region. The building is one of the largest Baroque works in all of Europe. It was built in 1700–1737 by reconstruction of a Renaissance structure from the 16th century. At the same time, French gardens and an English park were established. Since 1947, it has been owned by the state and opened to the public.

The Church of Saint Margaret is adjacent to the castle. The original church was rebuilt in the Baroque style from 1716 to 1782. Both the castle and the church were most likely designed by architect Jakob Prandtauer. The castle and the church are protected together as one national cultural monument.

A museum dedicated to poet Otokar Březina is located in the house where he lived until his death.

== Notable people ==
- František Antonín Míča (1694–1744), conductor and composer; lived and died here
- František Adam Míča (1746–1811), composer
- Otokar Březina (1868–1929), poet and essayist; lived and died here
