= Imperial Knight =

Free nobles of the Holy Roman Empire

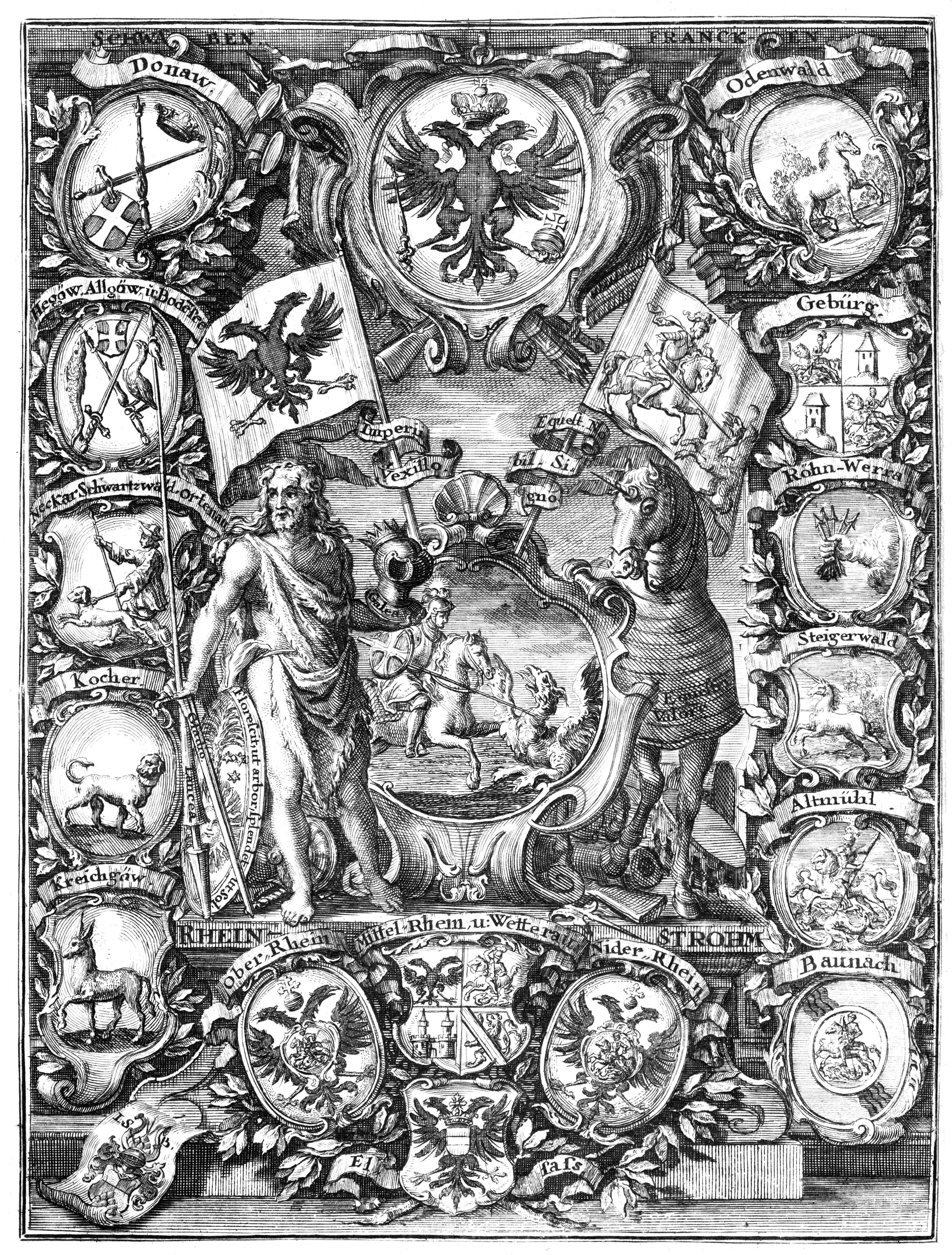
15 Knight-cantons (Ritterorten) are represented in this print from 1721 by Johann Stephan Burgermeister

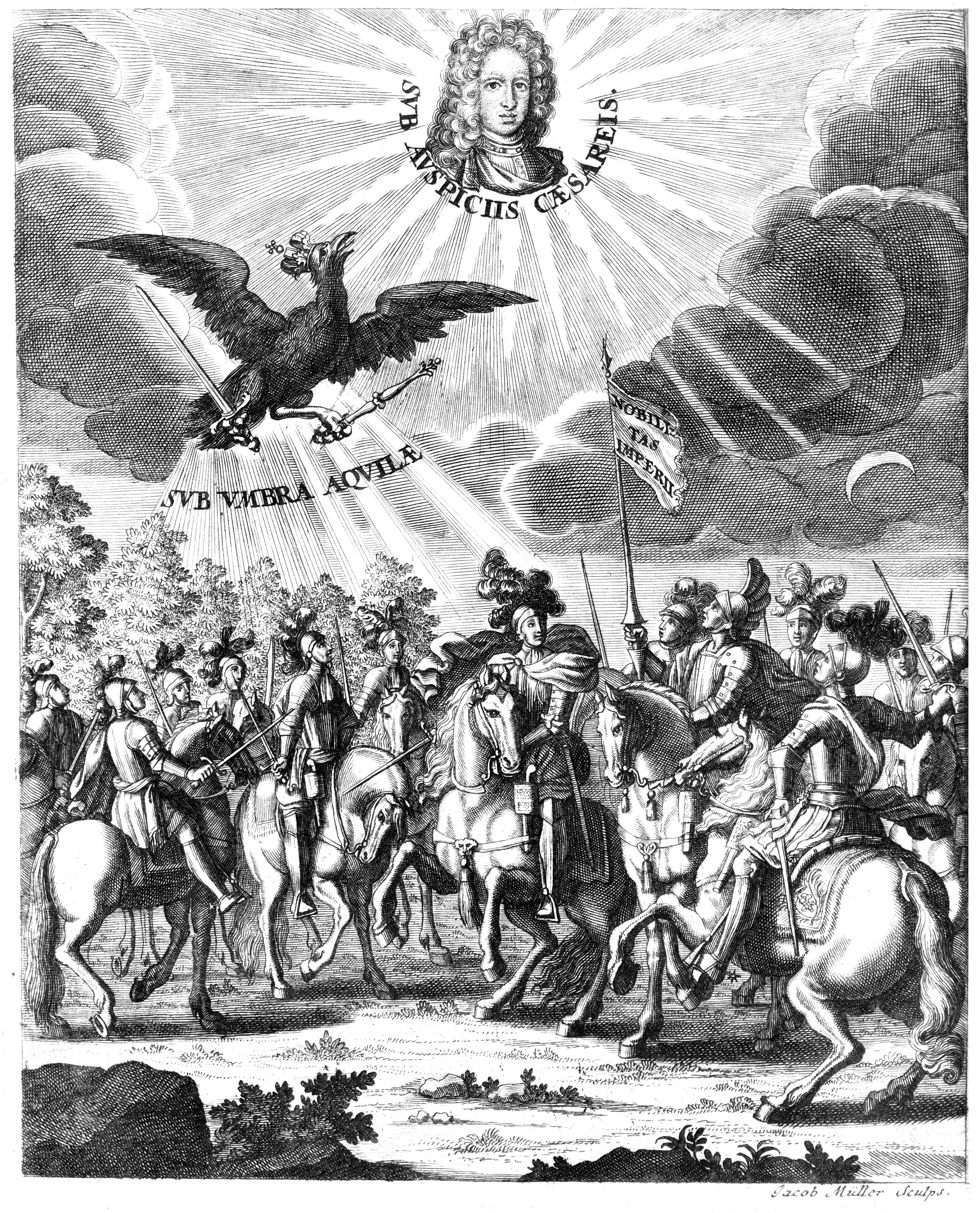
Engraving depicting the Imperial Knights, 1710

The Free Imperial Knights (German: Reichsritter, Latin: Eques imperii) were free nobles of the Holy Roman Empire, whose direct overlord was the Emperor. They were the remnants of the medieval free nobility (edelfrei) and the ministeriales. What distinguished them from other knights, who were vassals of a higher lord, was that they had been granted imperial immediacy, and as such were the equals in most respects to the other individuals or entities, such as the secular and ecclesiastical territorial rulers of the Empire (margraves, dukes, princes, counts, archbishops, bishops, abbots, etc.) and the free imperial cities, that also enjoyed Imperial immediacy. However, unlike all of those, the Imperial knights did not possess the status of Estates (Stände) of the Empire, and therefore were not represented, individually or collectively, in the Imperial Diet. They tended to define their responsibilities to the Empire in terms of feudalized obligations to the Emperor, including personal service and strictly voluntary financial offerings paid to the Emperor himself.

To protect their rights and avoid vassalage to more powerful nobles, they organized themselves into three unions (Partheien) in the late 15th century and into a single body in 1577, and fought to win recognition. This status, beholden only to the Emperor himself rather than through a more powerful noble, meant the Imperial Knights were "immediate subjects" (their fealty was unmediated by another lord). As such, the Imperial Knights exercised a limited form of sovereignty within their territories.

The Imperial Knighthood was a regional phenomenon limited to southwestern and south-central Germany—Swabia, Franconia and the Middle Rhine area—zones which were highly fragmented politically and where no powerful states were able to develop. In northern and northeastern Germany, as well as in Bavaria and the Archduchy of Austria, the local nobles, facing larger states and stronger rulers, were incapable of developing and maintaining their independence. They formed the territorial nobility.

The immediate status of the Imperial Knights was recognized at the Peace of Westphalia. They never gained access to the Imperial Diet, the parliament of lords, and were not considered Hochadel, the high nobility, belonging to the Lower Nobility.

== History ==
=== Origins ===
The Free Imperial Knights arose in the 14th century, the fusion of the remnants of the old free lords (Edelfrei) and the stronger elements of the unfree ministeriales that had won noble status.

Around 1300, the manorial economy suffered contraction due to the fluctuation in the price of agricultural foodstuffs. Ministeriales who were in a stronger economic position were better able to survive the weakening of their basis as landowners. The vast majority languished in poverty, resorting to selling lands to the Church, or to brigandage.

The minority of ministeriales rich enough to weather the crises soon came to be identified with the remnants of the free nobility, and were thus seen as constituting one noble order. By 1422, some of these nobles had achieved jurisdictional autonomy under the Emperor (‘immediacy’), and the corporation of free imperial knights was born. The other ministeriales that did not manage to receive the status of immediate vassals of the Emperor were gradually transformed into a titled nobility of free status: the Freiherren (Barons). By 1577, the Imperial Knights achieved the status of a noble corporate body within the empire: the corpus equestre.

In the Peace of Westphalia, the privileges of the Imperial Knights were confirmed. The knights paid their own tax (voluntary) to the Emperor, possessed limited sovereignty (rights of legislation, taxation, civil jurisdiction, police, coin, tariff, hunt; certain forms of justice), and the ius reformandi (the right to establish an official Christian denomination in their territories). The knightly families had the right of house legislation, subject to the Emperor's approval, and so could control such things as the marriage of members and set the terms of the inheritance of family property. Imperial knights did not, however, have access to the Imperial Diet.

Concerning the rights of Free Imperial Knights, Joseph Friederich von Ledersheim wrote in 1715 (De jure et privilegiis nobilium liberorum et immediatorum, Von des H. Röm. Reichs Freyen unmittelbahren Ritterschafft Discursus):

Section XII: “…they possess forestry rights (ius forestae)…the right of hunting (ius venandi); the right to establish an archive (ius archivi, a right of sovereignty); the capacity to make laws (facultatem leges atque statuas condendi); to send ambassadors (ius mittendi legatos) not only to the Emperor but to other kings and princes and those of whatever status; the right to establish pacts (ius constituendi foederae), of conducting war (bellum movendi), of constructing fortifications and walling forts (fortalitia extruendi et arces muniendi); without the need for permission they are able to call and hold assizes….they acknowledge no court but that of the Emperor, even though they hold no fiefs of the Emperor; the privilege against new fiefs being erected, the right to arbitration (ius Austregarum) no less than other states of the Empire have, even if they hold certain mediate fiefs from another prince.”

Section XV: “they enjoy the freedom of religion (pace religionis fruuntur) and therefore of establishing the Protestant Religion in churches and schools not only in their own hereditary territories but also in those fiefs held from another state…they are able whenever they wish to abolish and introduce either religion [Catholic or Protestant] if they hold the position of vogt over the possessions.”

All matters relating to the Imperial Knights' legal status as immediate vassals of the Emperor (house laws, debt, etc.) were managed by the Imperial Aulic Council.

=== Organization ===
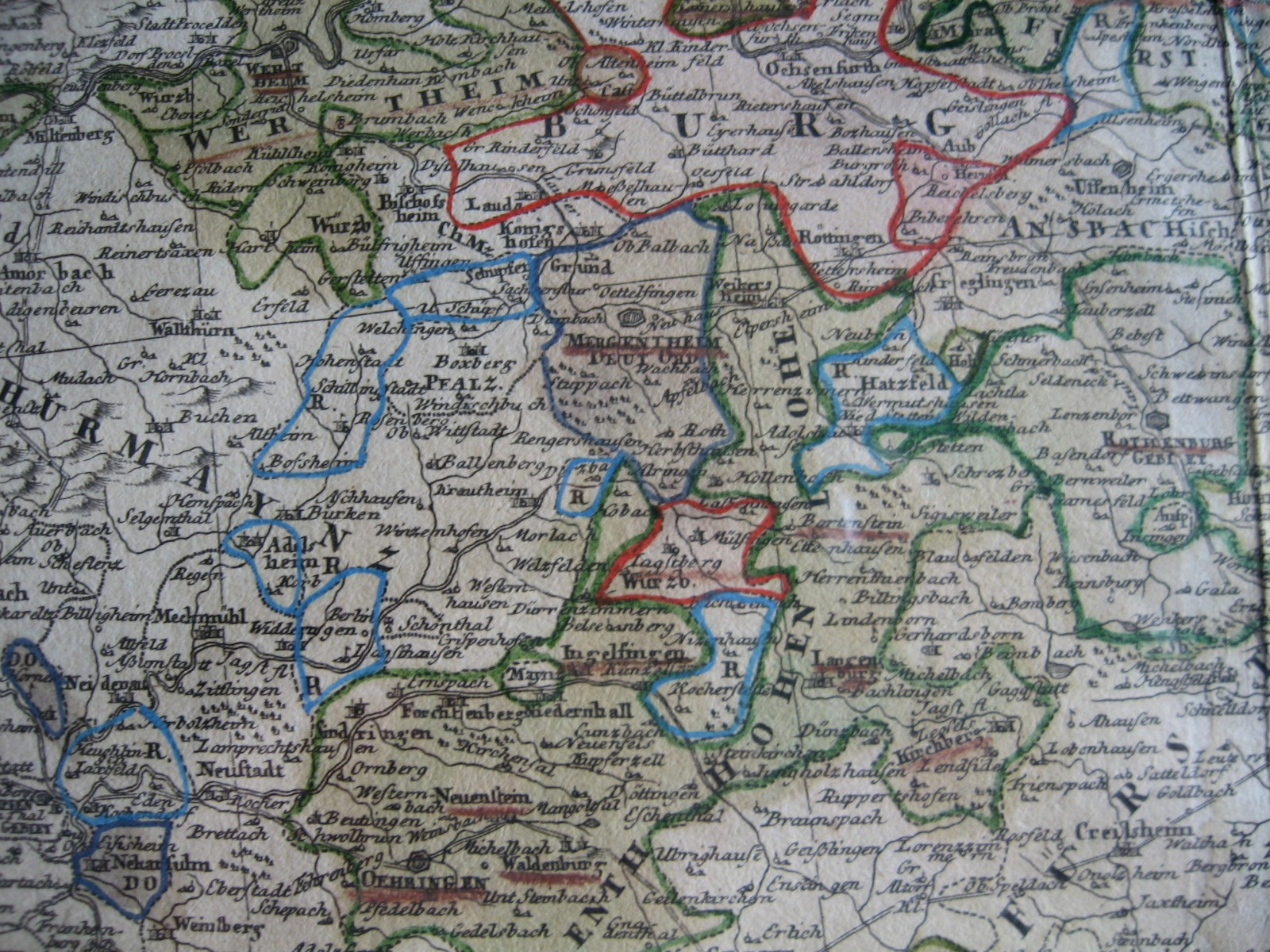
Estates of Imperial Knights (Mainz)

Lacking access to the Imperial Diet, in 1650 the immediate knights organized themselves into three circles (Ritterkreise): the Franconian, Swabian, and Rhenish Circles. The Circles in turn were divided into cantons (Ritterkantone), each of which exercised a high degree of autonomy. Each canton possessed a directorate (Direktorium), led by a director (Ritterhauptmann), who was elected for life, and a council (Ritterräte), whose members were elected for fixed terms. The director and councilors were knights themselves, but the daily activities of the Direktorium were carried out by legal experts (Konsulenten) and committees (Ausschüsse) staffed by non-nobles.

The Knights as a group were governed by the General Directorate (Generaldirektorium). This exercised the jus retractus, the right to buy back any land sold to a non-knight for the original price within three years, and the jus collectandi, the right to collect taxes for the upkeep of the knightly order, even on estates that had been sold to non-knights. The knights also had the right to tax their subjects directly, and also possessed the feudal rights to the corvée and the bannum. The knights' reputation for heavy taxes (the maligned Rittersteuer) and high judicial fines rendered them an anachronism in the eyes of imperial reformers.

From 1577 on, the Imperial Knights met in a congress called the Generalkorrespondenztag ("General Correspondence Diet"), but the Circles and especially the Cantons became somewhat more important as their proximity meant that their interests were more closely aligned. Some immediate imperial fiefs, however, fell outside the structure of the Circles and their Cantons. The autonomous barony (Freiherrschaft) of Haldenstein (in modern-day Switzerland) is an example.

By the late eighteenth century, the organization of the circles was as following:

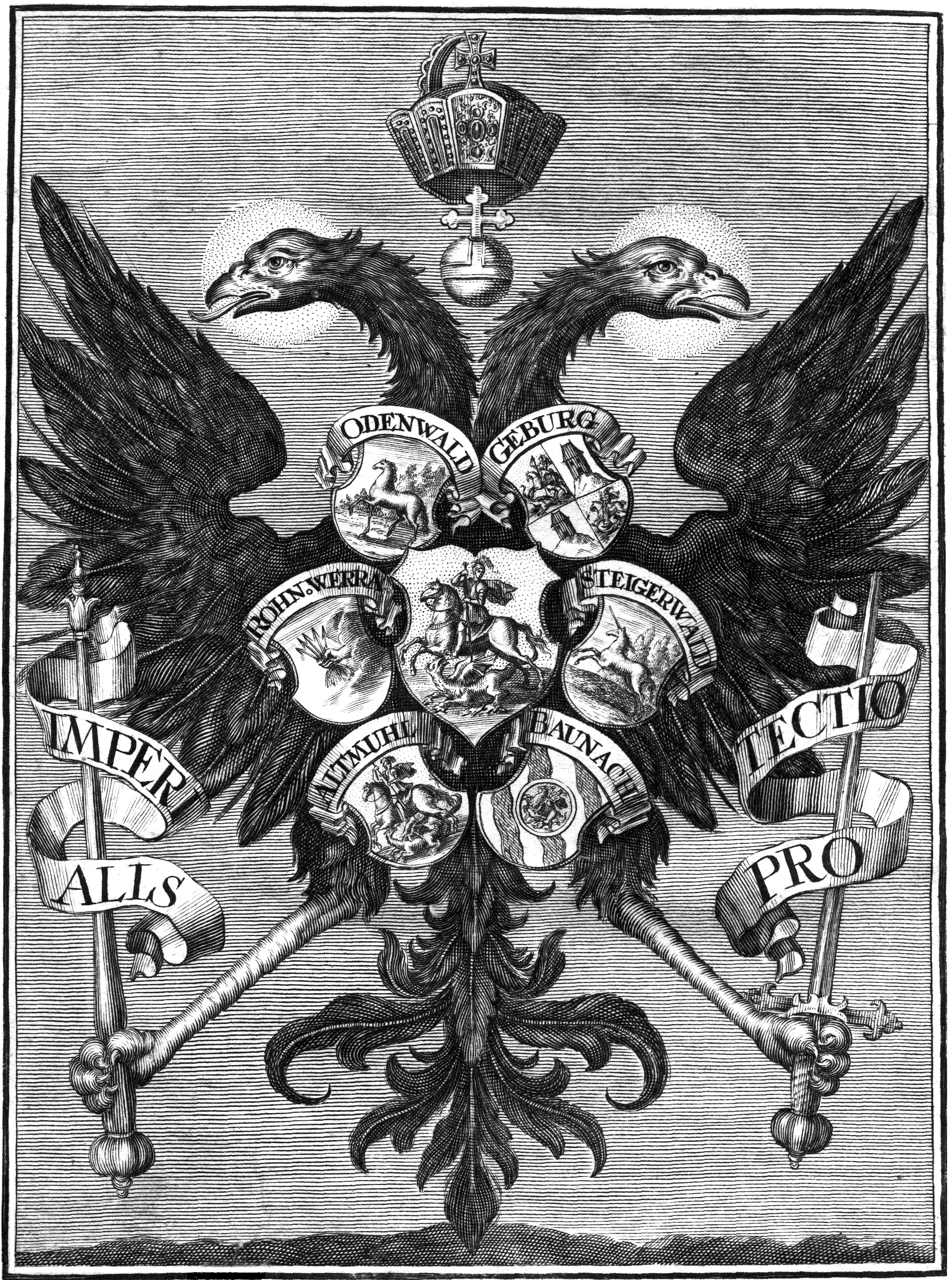
The Franconian Circle from Des heiligen Römischen Reichs ohnmittelbahr – Freyer Ritterschafft Der Sechs Ort in Francken, 1720

Franconian Circle (six cantons)

- Odenwald (seat: Kochendorf near Heilbronn)
- Steigerwald (seat: Erlangen)
- Altmühl (seat: Wilhermsdorf near Emskirchen)
- Baunach (seat: Nuremberg)
- Rhön-Werra (seat: Schweinfurt)
- Gebürg (seat: Bamberg)

Swabian Circle (five cantons)

- Danube (seat: Ehingen)
- Hegau-Allgäu-Bodensee (seat: Radolfzell)
- Kocher (seat: Esslingen)
- Kraichgau (seat: Heilbronn)
- Neckar-Schwarzwald (seat: Tübingen)

(Note: The semi-autonomous District Ortenau was affiliated with canton Neckar-Schwarzwald. District Ortenau served as the chief organizational connection to the empire for the Alsatian immediate nobility that had been absorbed by the French reunions of the seventeenth century.)

Rhenish Circle (three cantons)

- Upper Rhine (seat: Mainz)
- Middle Rhine (seat: Friedberg)
- Lower Rhine (seat: Koblenz)

=== Immediate and mediate status ===
Whether or not an individual, an institution, or an area was directly subject to the Emperor's authority defined the status of ‘immediate’ and ‘mediate’ subject of the Empire (reichsunmittelbar, reichsmittelbar). The distinction was not restricted to noble subjects of the Emperor; for example, a number of high officials in the imperial courts and the chancery were immediate, whether noble or not.

Arising from the feudal connection between tenure of land and jurisdiction, the status of immediate subject was further distinct from that of a state of the Empire. There were many immediate territories that were not states of the Empire, and there could be states that were not immediate. Examples of tiny immediate territories include imperial villages (Gochsheim and Sennfeld near Schweinfurt), and some farms in Upper Swabia. The status of immediate subject of the Emperor could be held by an institution: the family of Thurn und Taxis held the imperial post as an immediate fief from the Emperor.

Mediate entities were subjects arranged under an intermediate jurisdiction between the entity itself and the Emperor.

=== Role in the Empire ===
The Imperial Knights were called very often to war by the emperor and therefore won significant influence in the Military and the Administration of the Empire and also over the more powerful nobles. Every Canton had its own Ritterhauptmann or Captain and kept detailed records of noble families and properties. The Imperial Knights were exempt from imperial taxes and were not required to quarter troops.

After the Protestant Reformation, most Imperial Knights remained Catholic and their families made up a substantial fraction of noble Catholics in much of the Empire outside Austria and Bavaria. This eventually led to the Imperial Knights exerting significant influence in the selection of several prince-bishops and prince-archbishops, giving them some influence in the Imperial Diet and the College of Princes.

=== Decline ===
Over time the title of Imperial Knight became a title of nobility rather than occupation. Many Imperial Knights even as early as the 16th century are more famous for their scholarly, artistic, or diplomatic work than their military achievements. During the demise of the Holy Roman Empire in 1803, the Knights' estates, which were generally enclaves, were seized by the great territorial states like Bavaria and Württemberg in the so-called Rittersturm. In 1806, the Treaty of the Confederation of the Rhine gave the great states unilateral powers and the Imperial Knights' possessions, hitherto completely independent under the Emperor, formally became part of the territories of the higher rulers, by whose territory they were surrounded. They, for the most part, took the title of Freiherr and submitted themselves to their new lords.

=== Numbers and membership ===
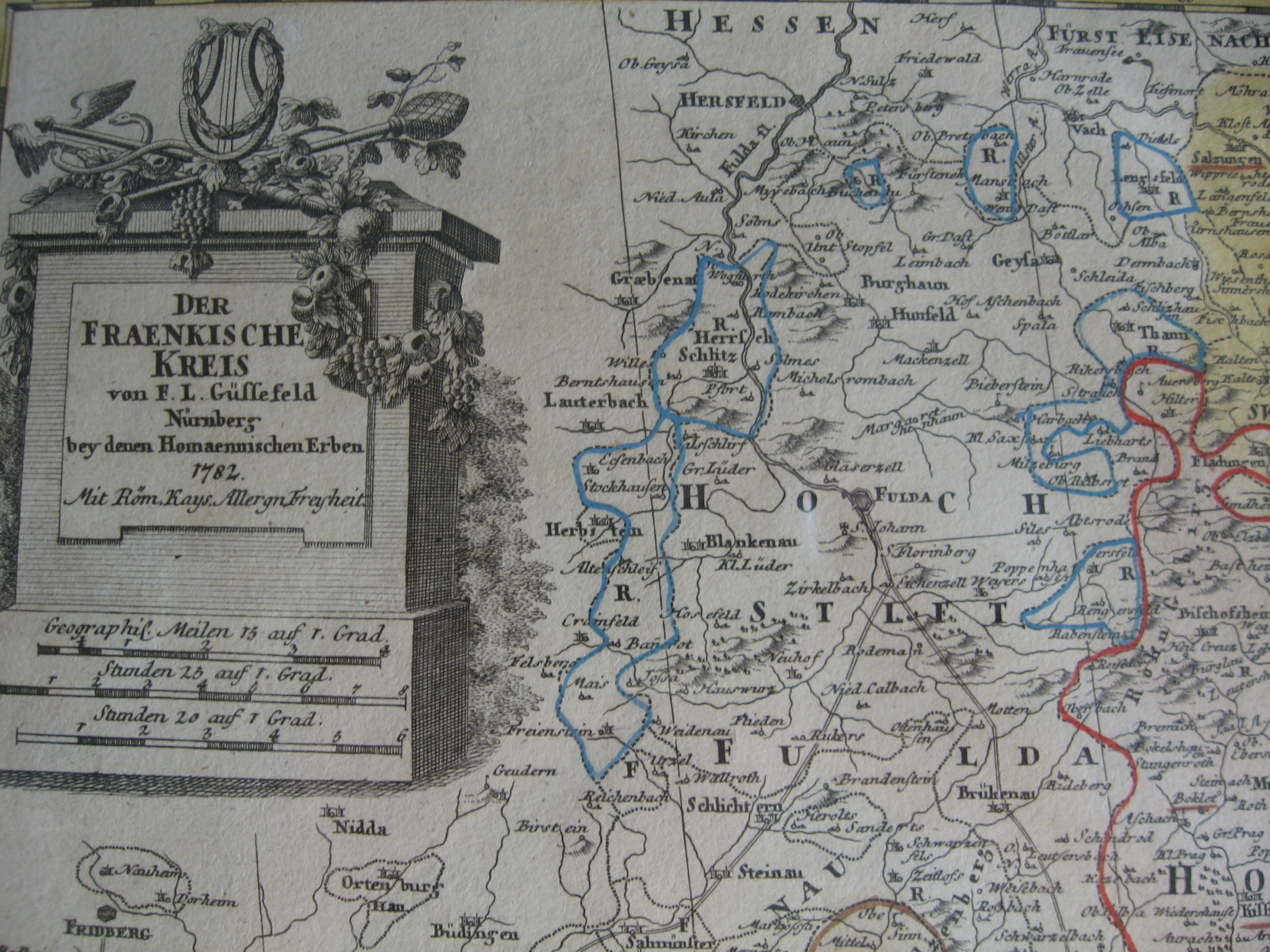
Estates of Imperial Knights (Fulda)

Exact numbers of Free Imperial Knights are difficult to assess. It is often stated that there were 350 knightly families in all three Circles, owning around 1,500 estates (around 200 German square miles, or about 4,400 English square miles), with a total population of 350,000–450,000 inhabitants. These figures, however, are drawn from claims for compensation made after the upheavals of the French Revolution, and are more accurate for their description of geographical extent than of the total membership in the order. There were at least 400 families possessing land and many more of knightly rank that did not possess land, the so-called Personalisten. With these latter included, the total number of knightly families rises to perhaps as high as 500. The discrepancies in the numbers stem from the list of membership for the Lower Rhenish canton being incomplete and from the absence of Personalisten from the claims of compensation.

From early on, the membership of the corporation of Imperial Knights controlled access to admission to its Circles and Cantons. There were two kinds of membership possible within the order: personal and landed. Landed members were families enrolled in a Circle and Canton who owned an immediate fief, and thus were subordinate to the Emperor directly. The personal members (Personalisten) were non-landed members – regularly admitted – who had not yet acquired estates under knightly jurisdiction. As a result, the Personalisten were not included in claims made for compensation. Consequently, the numbers of landed families were probably closer to 400, with the Personalisten adding another 100, bringing the total number of knightly families to around 500 at the time of the corporation's dissolution.

== Partial list of knightly families ==
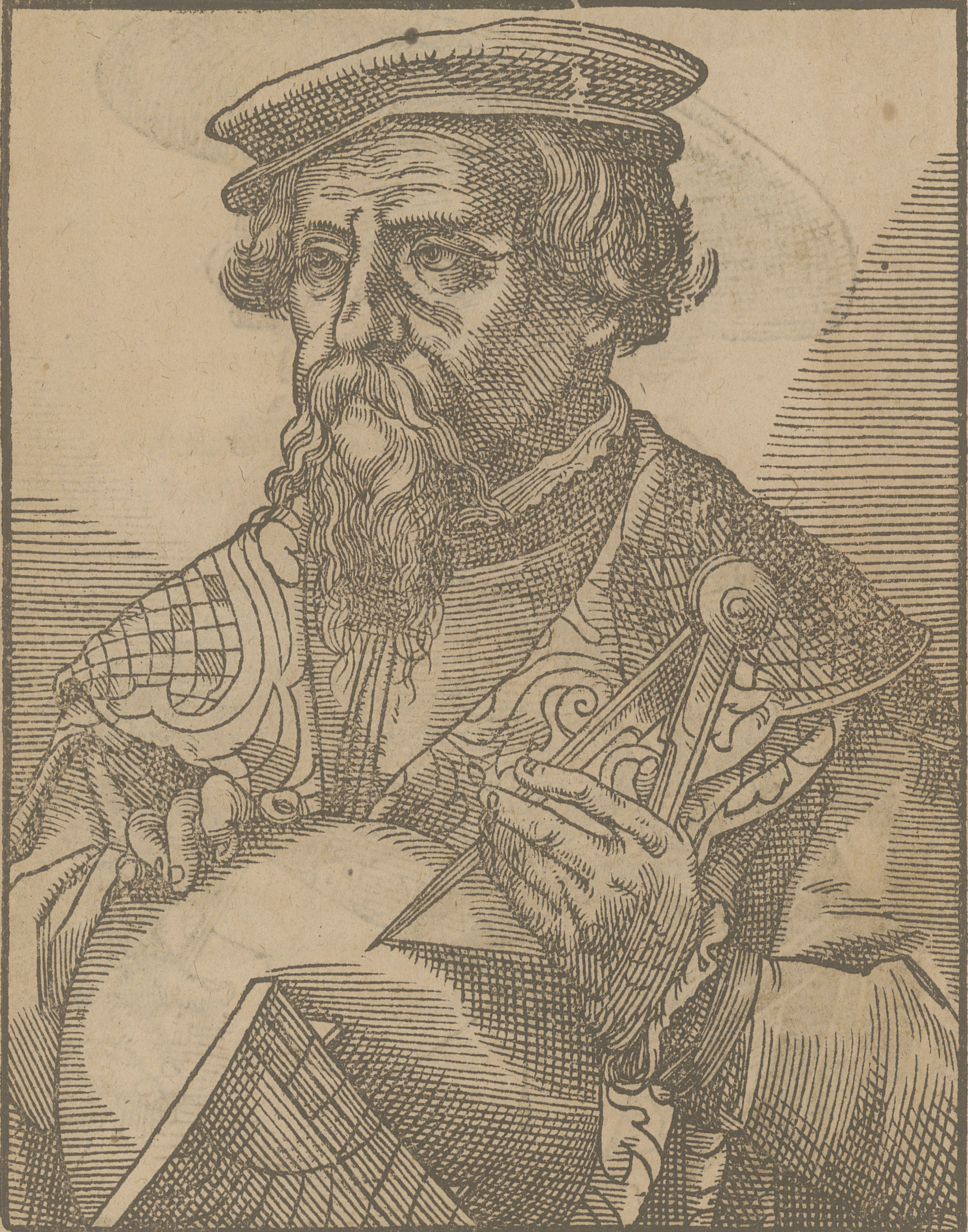
Peter Apianus, who was made an Imperial Knight, was known for his contributions to mathematics, astronomy, and cartography

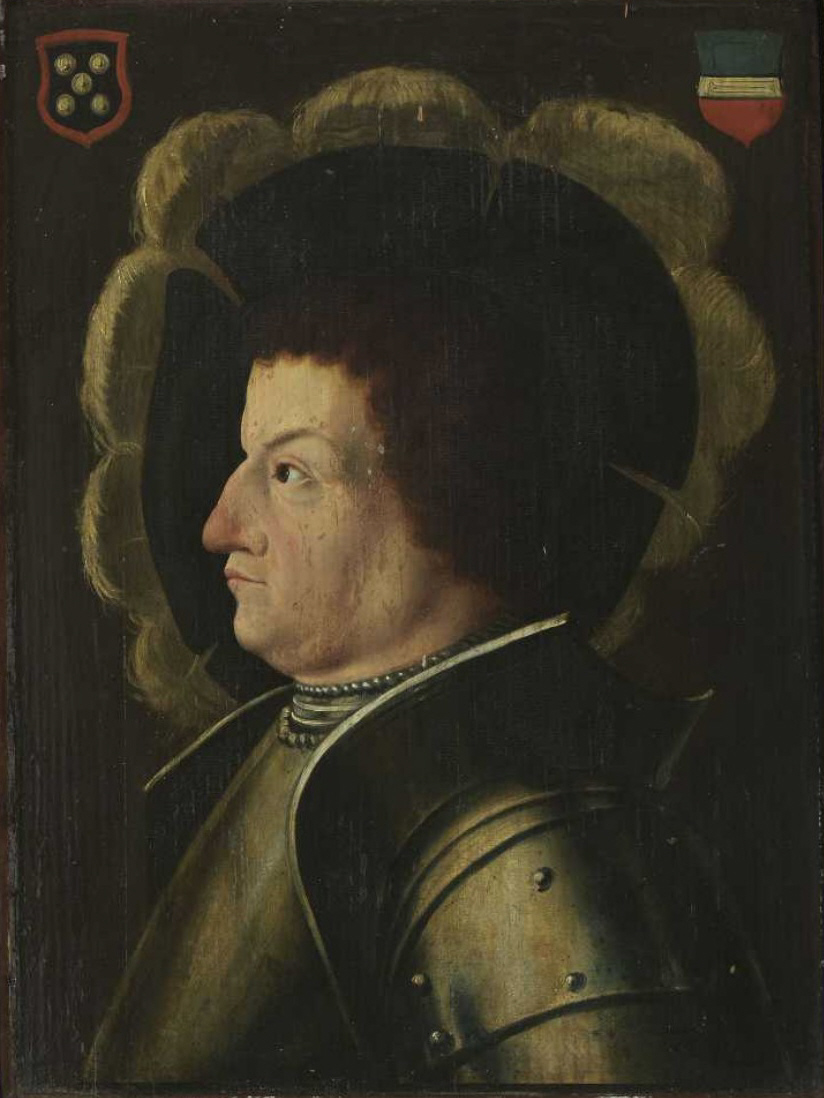
Franz von Sickingen

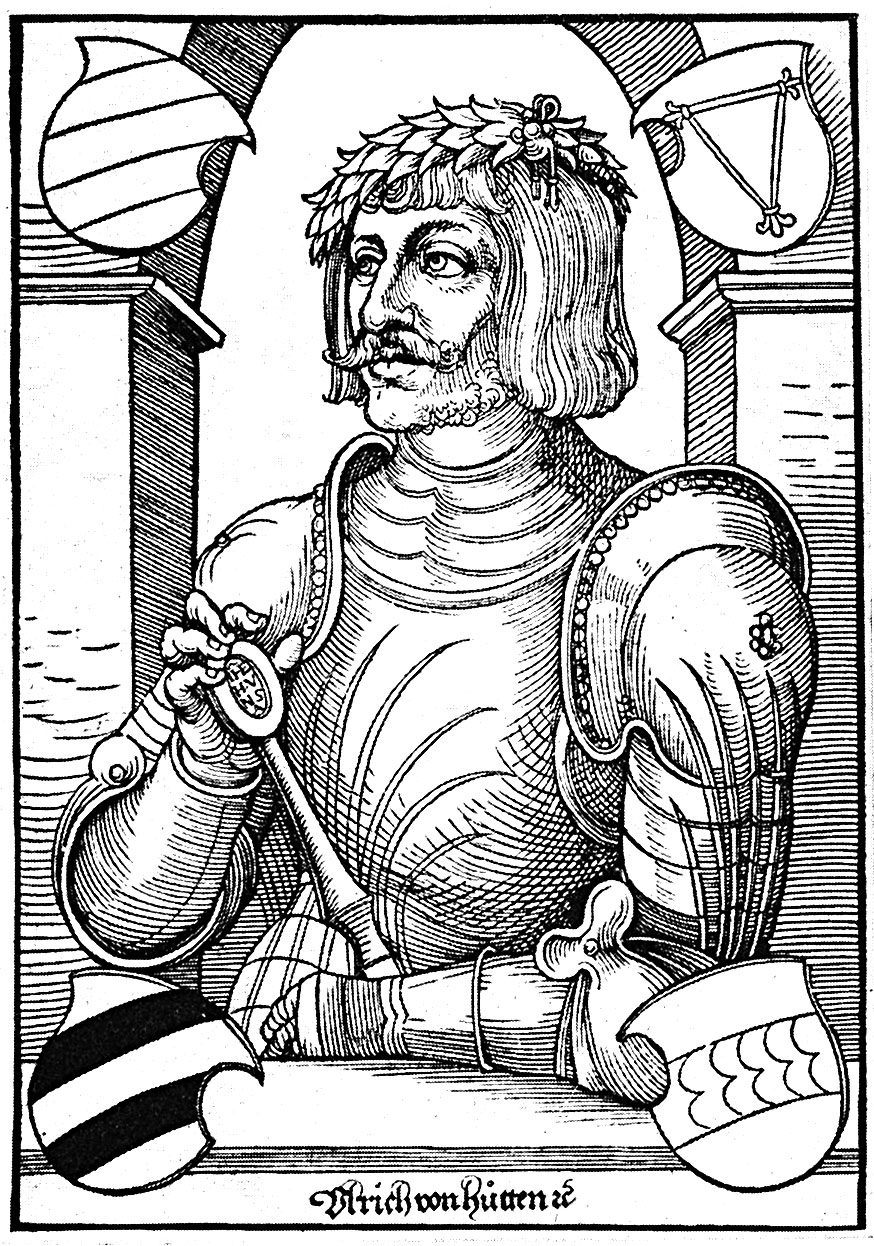
The Protestant Ulrich von Hutten

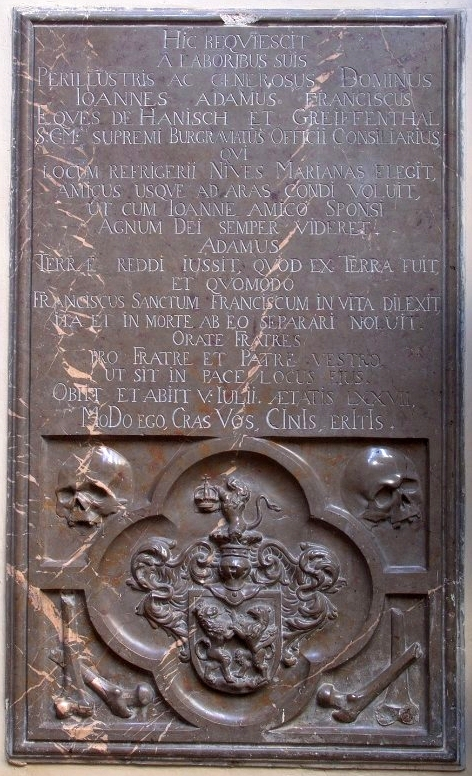
Johannes Hanisch von Greifenthal

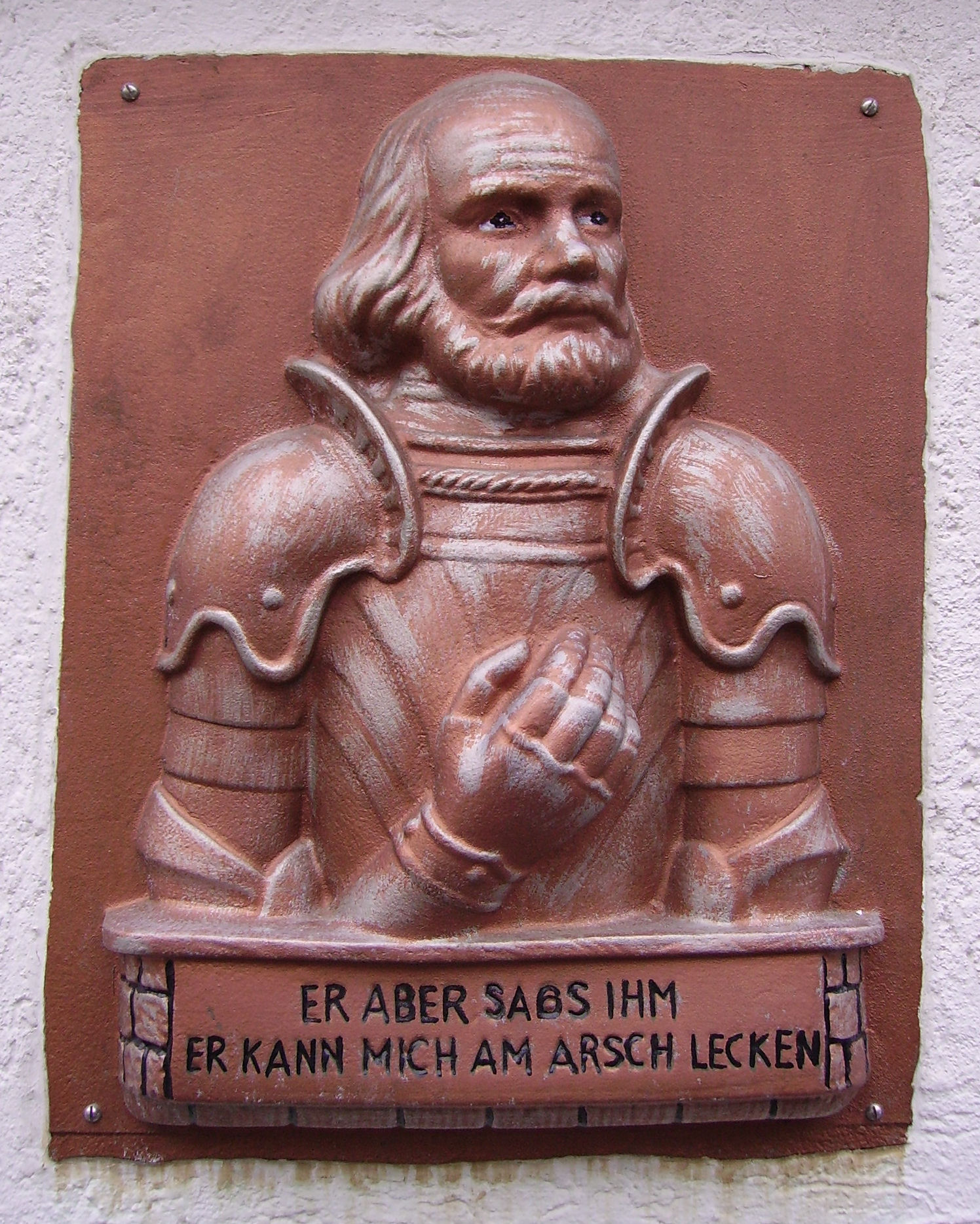
Götz von Berlichingen

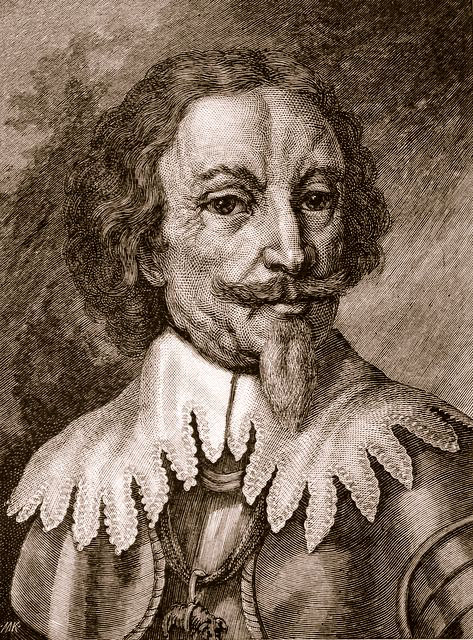
Gottfried Heinrich Graf zu Pappenheim

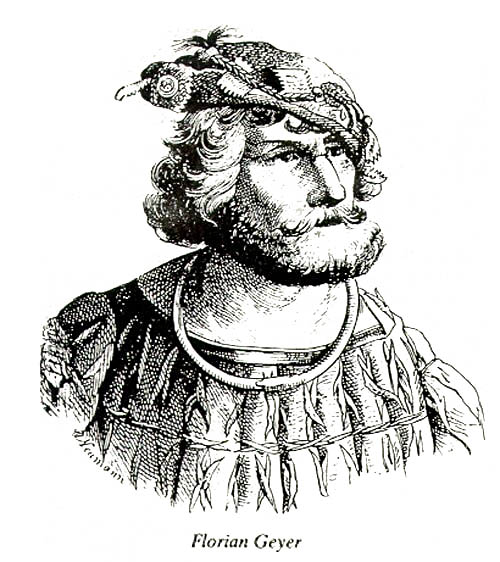
Florian Geyer

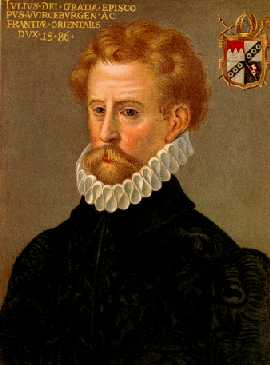
Prince-Bishop of Würzburg, Julius Echter von Mespelbrunn, and leader of the Counter Reformation, Painting from 1586

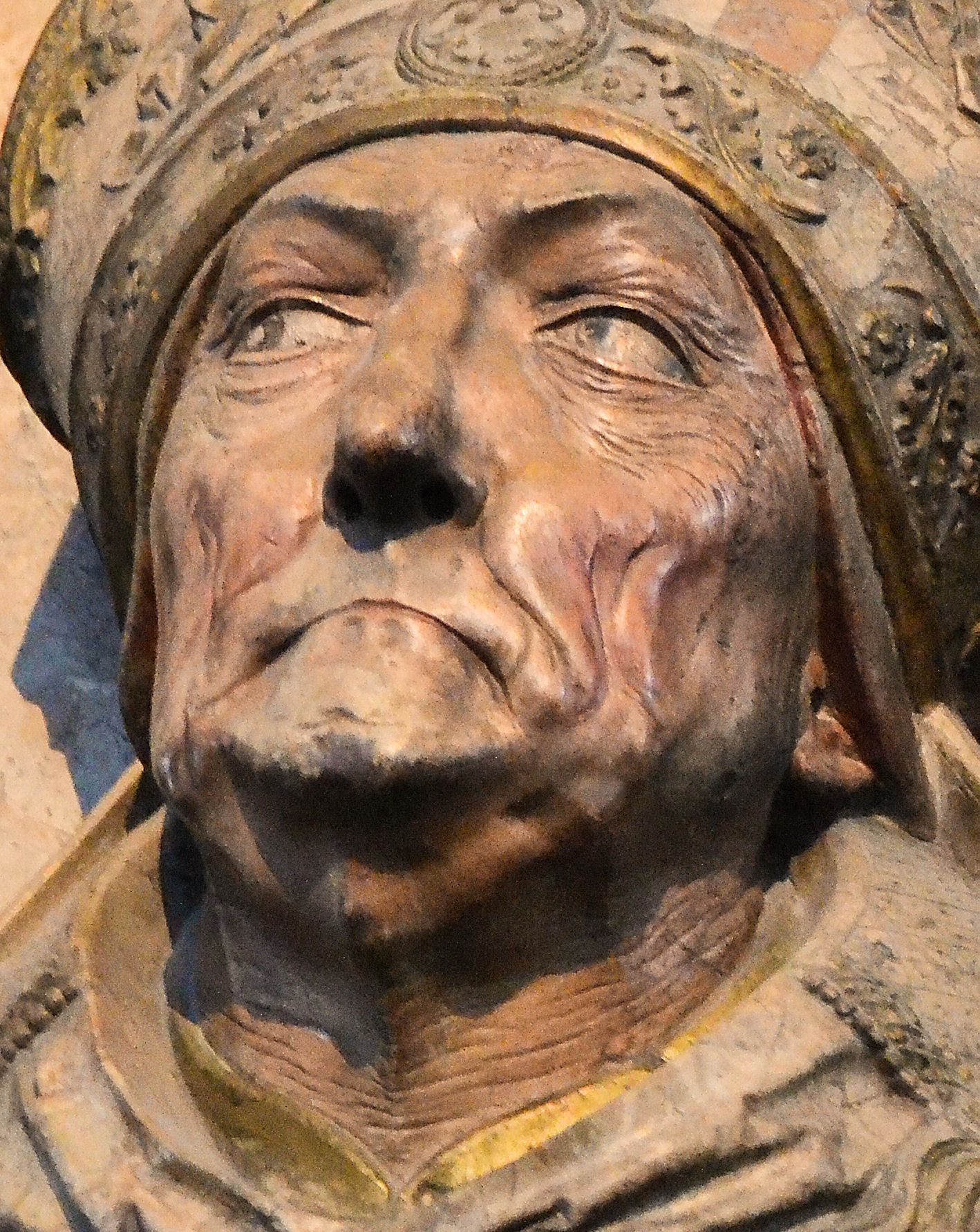
Detail of tomb of Prince-Bishop of Würzburg Rudolf von Scherenberg by Tilman Riemenschneider in Würzburg Cathedral (1496–1499).

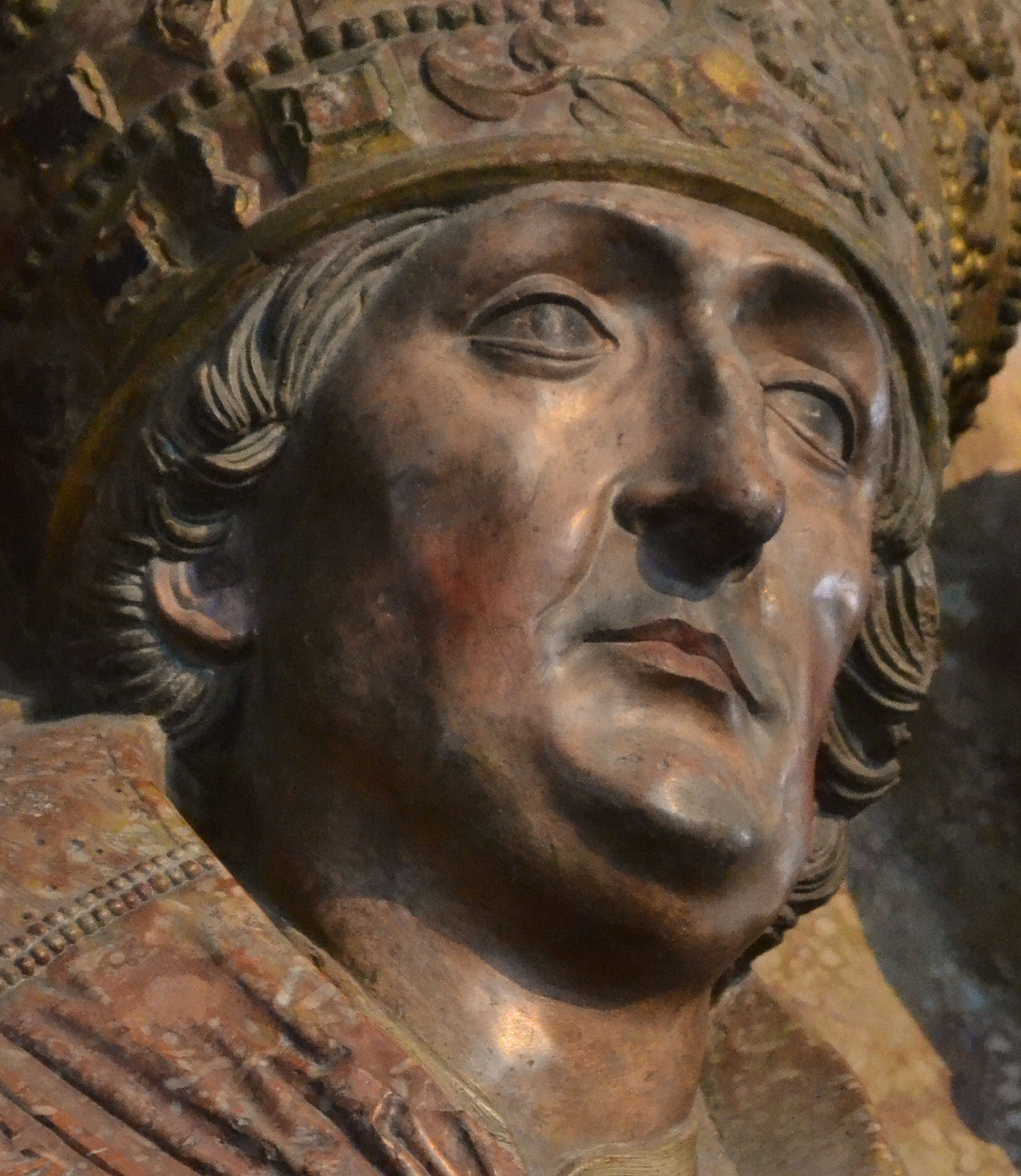
Detail of tomb of Prince-Bishop of Würzburg Lorenz von Bibra by Tilman Riemenschneider in Würzburg Cathedral.

=== A ===
- Adelmann (Kocher)
- Adelsheim (Odenwald)
- Aichinger (Gebürg)
- Altenstein (Baunach)
- Apian
- Arnim (Gebürg)
- Assenburg (Middle Rhine)
- Attems (Neckar-Schwarzwald)
- Aufseß (Gebürg)

=== B ===
- Bartenstein (Kocher)
- Baumgarten (Sweden)
- Bassenheim (Middle Rhine)
- Bastheim (Rhön-Werra)
- Bauz (Odenwald)
- Bechtolsheim (Steigerwald, Middle Rhine, Upper Rhine)
- Beckers (Upper Rhine)
- Bellersheim (Middle Rhine)
- Bemelberg (Danube)
- Benzel (Neckar-Shwarzwald)
- Berckheim (District Ortenau)
- Berga (Altmühl)
- Berlichingen (Odenwald, Kocher)
- Bern (Kocher)
- Bernhausen
- Beroldingen
- Berstett
- Bettendorf
- Bibra (Rhön-Werra, Steigerwald, Baunach, Altmühl, Gebürg)
- Bissingen (Neckar-Schwarzwald)
- Bobenhausen (Rhön-Werra)
- Bock (Upper Rhine, District Ortenau, Kocher)
- Bocklin (District Ortenau)
- Bodeck (District Ortenau)
- Bodmann (District Hegau)
- Boinenburg (Rhön-Werra)
- Bokdorf (Braunach)
- Boos-Waldeck (Middle Rhine, Upper Rhine)
- Bonnot
- Borié (Rhön-Werra)
- Börstling
- Botzheim (Upper Rhine, District Ortenau)
- Boyneburg-Bömelberg (lordship of Gemen; mediatized 1803)
- Brambilla (Wien)
- Brandenstein (District Ortenau)
- Brandi (Gebirg)
- Breidenbach-Breidenstein (Middle Rhine)
- Breidenbach-Bürresheim (Middle Rhine, Upper Rhine)
- Brockdorf (Gebürg)
- Bubenhofen (Neckar-Schwarzwald, Kocher)
- Buchenau (Rhön-Werra)
- Bulach (District Ortenau)
- Burscheid (Upper Rhine)
- Buseck (Middle Rhine)
- Buttlar (Middle Rhine)
- Buwinghausen (Kocher)

=== C ===
- Castell (Steigerwald)
- Chalon gen. Gehlen (Middle Rhine)
- Coudenhove (Middle Rhine)
- Crailsheim (Odenwald, Steigerwald, Altmühl)
- Cronenberg (Middle Rhine)

=== D ===
- Dalberg (Baunach, Middle Rhine, Upper Rhine)
- Degenfeld (Rhön-Werra, Odenwald, Middle Rhine, Upper Rhine, Kocher, Kraichgau)
- Deuring (District Hegau)
- Diede (Middle Rhine)
- Diemar (Rhön-Werra)
- Dienheim (Upper Rhine)
- Drachsdorf (Rhön-Werra)
- Dungern (District Ortenau)
- Dürckheim (Altmühl, District Ortenau)

=== E ===
- Ebersberg (Rhön-Werra)
- Edelsheim (Middle Rhine)
- Egkh (Neckar-Shwarzwald)
- Egloffstein (Gebirg, Steigerwald, Altmühl)
- Eichler (Altmühl)
- Ellrichshausen (Odenwald)
- Eltz (Middle Rhine, Upper Rhine)
- Enzberg (District Hegau)
- Erthal (Rhön-Werra, Baunach, Middle Rhine, Upper Rhine, Kocher, District Ortenau)
- Esbeck (Upper Rhine)
- Esch (Middle Rhine)
- Eyb (Odenwald, Altmühl, Danube)
- Eyben (Middle Rhine)
- Eys (Middle Rhine)

=== F ===
- Fahnenberg (Rhön-Werra)
- Falkenhausen (Altmühl)
- Fechenbach (Odenwald)
- Feiguier (Upper Rhine)
- Forster (Odenwald, Altmühl)
- Forstmeister (Middle Rhine)
- Forstner (Neckar-Schwarzwald)
- Frais (Upper Rhine)
- Franckenstein (house of) (Steigerwald, Middle Rhine, Upper Rhine, District Ortenau)
- Fren(t)z (Raitz von) (Middle Rhine)
- Freyberg (Danube, District Hegau, Neckar-Schwarzwald, Kocher)
- Fries (Altmühl)
- Fuchs (Baunach)
- Fuchs von Bimbach (Steigerwald)
- Fugger (Danube, Kocher)
- Fürstenberg (Middle Rhine, Upper Rhine)

=== G ===
- Gagern (Upper Rhine)
- Gail (District Ortenau)
- Gailing (District Ortenau)
- Gaisberg (Neckar-Schwarzwald, Kocher)
- Gebsattel (Rhön-Werra)
- Gedult-Jungenfeld (Upper Rhine)
- Geismar (Upper Rhine)
- Geispitzheim (Upper Rhine)
- Gemmingen (Odenwald, Upper Rhine, Neckar-Schwarzwald, Kocher, Kraichgau)
- Gerstorff (Middle Rhine)
- Geuder (Gebürg, Altmühl)
- Geyer (Odenwald)
- Geyso (Rhön-Werra)
- Giech (Gebirg)
- Gleichen (Rhön-Werra)
- Goeler (Kraichgau)
- Göllnitz (Neckar-Schwarzwald, Kocher)
- Görtz (Rhön-Werra, Middle Rhine)
- Greiffenclau (Odenwald, Baunach, Middle Rhine, Upper Rhine, Kocher)
- Grosclag (Odenwald)
- Groß (Gebirg, Baunach)
- Grupe
- Gudenus (Upper Rhine)
- Gültingen (Neckar-Schwarzwald, Kocher)
- Günerode (Middle Rhine)
- Guttenberg (Rhön-Werra, Gebirg, Baunach, Middle Rhine)

=== H ===
- Habermann (Rhön-Werra)
- Hacke (Upper Rhine)
- Hagen (Upper Rhine)
- Hahn (Middle Rhine; mediatized 1803)
- Hahnsberg (Middle Rhine: lordship of Bruck; mediatized 1803)
- Hallberg (Upper Rhine)
- Haller (Altmühl)
- Hanisch (von Greifenthal)
- Harling (Upper Rhine, Neckar-Schwarzwald, Kocher)
- Hatzfeld (Odenwald, Middle Rhine: lordship of Wildenberg; mediatized 1803)
- Haxhausen (Odenwald, Upper Rhine)
- Heddersdorf (Middle Rhine, Upper Rhine)
- Hees (Upper Rhine)
- Helmstatt (Kraichgau)
- Hess (Kocher)
- Hessberg (Gebirg)
- Hettersdorf (Odenwald, Baunach)
- Heuslin v. Eusenheim (Rhön-Werra, Gebirg)
- Hofen (Kocher)
- Hoheneck (Middle Rhine, Upper Rhine)
- Hohenfeld (Middle Rhine)
- Holtz (Odenwald, Kocher)
- Holtzschuher (Steigerwald)
- Horben (District Allgäu-Bodensee)
- Horneck (Gebirg, Baunach, Upper Rhine)
- Hornstein (Danube, District Hegau)
- Hoyen (Middle Rhine)
- Hundbiss (District Allgäu-Bodensee)
- Hutten (Rhön-Werra, Middle Rhine)

=== I ===
- Ichtrazheim (District Ortenau)
- Ifflinger (Neckar-Schwarzwald)
- Imhof (Baunach, Upper Rhine)
- Ingelheim (Odenwald, Middle Rhine, Upper Rhine)

=== J ===
- Jett (Upper Rhine)
- Jakob (Upper Rhine)

=== K ===
- Kageneck (Danube)
- Kalbsried (Rhön-Werra)
- Kamauff
- Karg (Gebirg, Baunach)
- Keller (Neckar-Schwarzwald)
- Kellerbach (Upper Rhine)
- Kere / Kera (Rhön-Werra, Steigerwald, Baunach)
- Kerpen (Upper Rhine)
- Kesselstatt (Middle Rhine)
- Kieningen (Upper Rhine)
- Knebel (Middle Rhine, District Ortenau)
- Kniestedt (Neckar-Schwarzwald, Kocher)
- Knöringen (Altmühl)
- Koeth (Upper Rhine)
- Kofler (Upper Rhine)
- Kolowrat (Danube)
- Koniz (Baunach)
- Kress (Altmühl)
- Krohn
- Künsberg (Gebirg, Baunach, Steigerwald)

=== L ===
- Lang (Kocher)
- Langwerth (Middle Rhine, Upper Rhine)
- Lasser (Danube)
- Lehrbach (Odenwald, Upper Rhine)
- Lentnersheim (Altmühl)
- Leonrodt (Neckar-Schwarzwald)
- Leonrodt (Neckar-Schwarzwald) (Two separate families with the same name.)
- Leuchselring (Augsburg)
- Leutrum (Neckar-Schwarzwald)
- Leyden (Kocher)
- Leyder (Danube)
- Leyen (Middle Rhine, Upper Rhine)
- Liebenfels (District Hegau)
- Liebenstein (Danube, Kocher)
- Lichtenstern (Baunach)
- Lochner (Rhön-Werra, Gebirg)
- Loë (Middle Rhine)
- Löw (Middle Rhine)
- Löwenstein (Odenwald)

=== M ===
- Maiershofen
- Malapert-Neufville
- Mansbach
- Marioth
- Marschall von Ostheim
- Massenbach
- Mayerhofen
- Metternich (Middle Rhine, Upper Rhine: county of Ochsenhausen; mediatized 1803)
- Migazzi
- Molsberg
- Mozzian
- Müller
- Münch
- Münster

=== N ===
- Neipperg
- Nesselrode
- Neuenstein
- Neveu
- Nordeck zu Rabenau
- Neufforge

=== O ===
- Oberkirch
- Oberndorff
- Oelhaften
- Oetinger
- Olnhausen
- Ostein (Middle Rhine: lordship of Buxheim; mediatized 1803)
- Osterberg
- Ow

=== P ===
- Palm
- Pappenheim
- Pappius
- Paumgarten
- Pergen
- Pfetten
- Plittersdorf
- Pöllnitz
- Prettlack
- Preuschen (Middle Rhine)
- Preysing
- Prör
- Pruglach

=== Q ===
- Quadt (Upper Rhine: county of Isny; mediatized 1803)

=== R ===
- Raitz von Frentz (Middle Rhine)
- Raknitz
- Rassler
- Rathsamhausen
- Ratzenried
- Rau
- Rechberg
- Redwitz
- Rehling
- Reibeld
- Reichlin
- Reigersberg
- Reischach
- Reitzenstein
- Reutner
- Rhode
- Riaucour
- Riedesel (Rhön-Werra: the lordships of Lauterbach, Stockhausen, Moos und Freienstein; mediatized 1803)
- Riedheim
- Riez
- Ritter
- Roeder
- Rosenbach
- Rotenhahn
- Roth-Schreckenstein
- Rüdt
- Rumerskirch

=== S ===
- Saint-André
- Saint-Vincent
- Salis-Haldenstein (Graubunden)
- Schall
- Schaunberg
- Schaumberg
- Scheldt
- Schenk
- Schenk von Schweinsberg
- Scherenberg
- Schergenstein
- Schertel
- Schilling
- Schler
- Schlus
- Schmidburg
- Schmitz
- Schönborn (Gebirg: lordship of Wiesentheid; mediatized 1803)
- Schrottenberg
- Schütz
- Schwartzenberg
- Seckendorf
- Seefried
- Seinsheim
- Senfft
- Serpes
- Sickingen
- Siles
- Sodden
- Sohlern
- Sparr
- Spaur
- Specht
- Speshardt
- Speth
- Stadion (Steigerwald, Danube: lordship of Warthausen; mediatized 1803)
- Stauffenberg (Gebürg, Rhön-Werra and Steigerwald)
- Stein
- Steinhorst
- Stetten
- Stolzingen
- Stubenberg (all three circles)
- Sturmfeder
- Syberg

=== T ===
- Tätessin
- Targin, Targino, Targini (Alsace, Lombardy)
- Than
- Thannhausen
- Thrumbach
- Thumb
- Thungen
- Thurn
- Törring-Seefeld (Danube: county of Guttenzell)
- Truchseß von Wetzhausen (Baunach: possessions of the Princes and Counts of Truchseß-Waldburg; mediatized 1803)
- Tucher
- Türkheim

=== U ===
- Üxküll
- Uiberbruck
- Ullmer
- Ulm
- Umgelter
- Varnbühler
- Venningen
- Vieregg
- Vittinghoff
- Vogt-hunolstein
- Voit
- Voit von Rieneck
- Voit von Salzburg
- Von Beetzen
- von Vatz
- Vorster

=== W ===
- Waldenburg-Schenkern
- Waldenfels
- Walderdorff
- Waldkirch
- Waldner
- Wallbrunn
- Wallmoden-Gimborn (Middle Rhine: lordship of Gimborn-Neustadt; mediatized 1803)
- Wambolt
- Warsberg (Lower Rhine)
- Weihmar
- Weiler
- Weitersheim
- Welden
- Welling
- Welschberg
- Welser
- Wendt (Middle Rhine:lordship of Hardenberg; mediatized 1803)
- Wenz
- Westernach
- Westphalen
- Wetzel
- Wiesenthau
- Wildberg
- Wildungen
- Winkler
- Winkler von Mohrenfels
- Wolfskehl
- Wöllwarth
- Wollzogen
- Wrede
- Wurmser
- Würtzburg (Gebürg)

=== Z ===
- Zech
- Zobel
- Zöllner
- Zorn
- Zyllnhardt

== See also ==
- Freiherr
