= Raitz von Frentz =

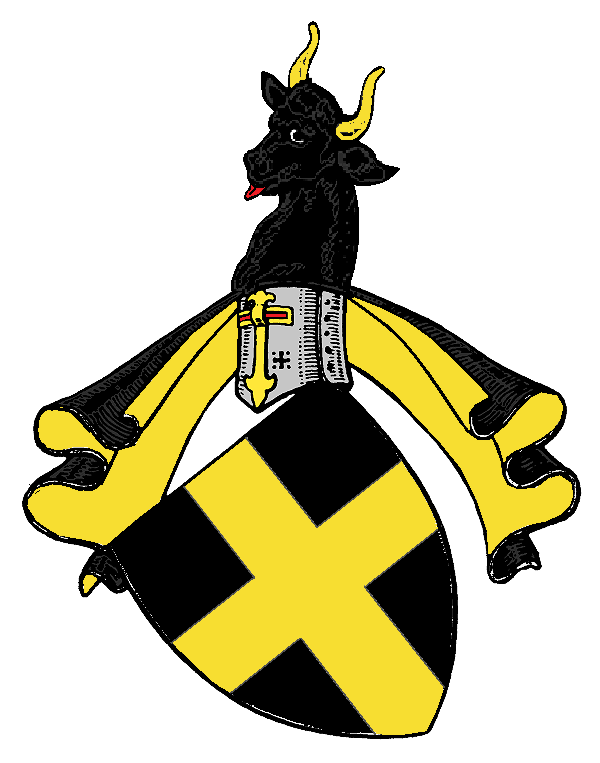
Coat of arms (Stammwappen)

Raitz von Frentz is the name of a baronial (freiherrlichen) family, that belongs to the German ancient nobility (Uradel). The Barons Raitz von Frentz should be distinguished from the dynastic family "von Frenz", a branch of the Dukes of Limburg, that became extinct in the 14th century.

== History ==
The Raitz von Frentz is one of the oldest patrician and noble (Rittergeschlechtern) families of the free imperial city of Cologne (Reichsstadt Köln). A member of the family Raitz (Razo) was first mentioned in a document as witness of the Archbishop Wichfrid of Cologne in the year 948. The uninterrupted line of ancestors starts with the Ministerialis Raitz at St. Pantaleon Abbey in Cologne, 1106–1154. In the Middle Ages several members of the family were mayors of the free imperial city of Cologne.

Lord Rutger Raitz (I.), mayor of the free imperial city of Cologne (1294 and 1304), was married to Lady Ida von Heppendorf, daughter of Lord Gerhard III von Heppendorf, noble reeve of the Electoral Principality of Cologne, who (after Rutger died) was married to Count Ruprecht III von Virneburg in 1330. Her son Lord Rutger Raitz (II.) bought in 1347 from his step father the castle and the lordship of Frentz near Quadrath-Ichendorf, which is now known as Frens Castle. Lordship and castle were a fief(Lehen) of the Dukes of Limburg, and originally belonged to a branch of that family. Since 1347 the family is called Raitz von Fren(t)z.

Members of the family Raitz von Frentz were Free Imperial Knights (also called: Knights of the Holy Roman Empire) (Reichsritterschaft). Since 1620 the family became hereditary treasurer (Erbkämmerer) of the Electoral Principality of Cologne, which was ruled by the Prince-Elector and Arch-Bishop of Cologne.

In 1635 the branch "Raitz von Frentz zu Kendenich und Stolberg", was created hereditary Baron of the Holy Roman Empire (Reichsfreiherrenstand). This branch became extinct in 1746. The family received the lordship of Kendenich at the beginning of the 16th century, when Robert Raitz von Frentz married Agnes von Orsbeck zu Kendenich. In 1648 the family received the lordship and castle Stolberg when Ferdinand Baron of the Holy Roman Empire Raitz von Frentz zu Kendenich married Odilia Maria Baroness von Efferen zu Stolberg, daughter of Baron Adolf von Efferen and Gertrud, née Lady von Metternich.

In 1512 Lord Winand Raitz von Frentz married Lady Maria von und zu Schlenderhan, the last of her line. This branch consequently received the lordship of Schlenderhan and was henceforth known as "Raitz von Frentz von und zu Schlenderhan". The branch was created Baron of the Holy Roman Empire (Reichsfreiherrenstand) as "Raitz von Frentz von und zu Schlenderhan und Kleinenbruch" on 15 July 1650.

On 25 October 1652, the branch "Raitz von Frentz von und zu Schlenderhan" received the county Odenkirchen from the Prince-Elector and Archbishop of Cologne Maximilian Heinrich and was created Hereditary Burgrave (Erbburggraf) of the Electoral Principality of Cologne. On 11 June 1672 the immatriculation among the nobility of the Kingdom of Bohemia (Inkolat) followed. In 1826 the King of Prussia recognised the [barony](Freiherrenstand) of the only surviving branch Raitz von Frentz von und zu Schlenderhan and the branch Freiherr Raitz von Frentz zu Kellenberg, which became extinct in the late 19th century.

All male members of the family bear the name Freiherr (Baron) Raitz von Frentz, their wives that of Freifrau (Baroness) Raitz von Frentz. A daughter of a married male member of the family is called Freiin (Baroness) Raitz von Frentz.

== Coat of arms ==
The original coat of arms shows a continuous golden cross on a black background. The helmet decoration of the coat of arms consists of neck and head of a black bull with golden horns. The helmet covers are black-golden. The oldest preserved seal with the cross coat of arms dates from 20 January 1289 of "Theodericus dictus Raitze miles, civis Colon" and his sons.

The coat of arms of the Raitz von Frentz was changed in each case on the occasion of the elevation of two lines into the rank of Barons of the Holy Roman Empire.

On the occasion of the elevation of the line Raitz von Frentz zu Kendenich und Stolberg to the status of imperial barons, the coat of arms of this line was confirmed as follows in 1635: Quarter: Box 1 and 4: A continuous golden cross on a black background. Box 2 and 3: Two red rafters in silver.

The coat of arms of the Raitz von Frentz von und zu Schlenderhan line was confirmed as follows on the occasion of its elevation to imperial barons in 1650: Quarter: Box 1 and 4: A continuous golden cross on a black background. Box 2 and 3: A black bar in silver, covered with 3 golden blackbirds. Red-blue divided, a silver, gold-crowned lion above. The heart shield was also added on the occasion of the awarding of the title of Baron of the Holy Roman Empire.

== Places (currently owned by the Raitz von Frentz) ==
- Haus Stapel (Westfalia)
- Burg Dreiborn (Eifel)
- Untere Burg Antweiler (Eifel)
- Haus Müttinghoven (near Bonn)
- Bakenhof (near Krefeld)
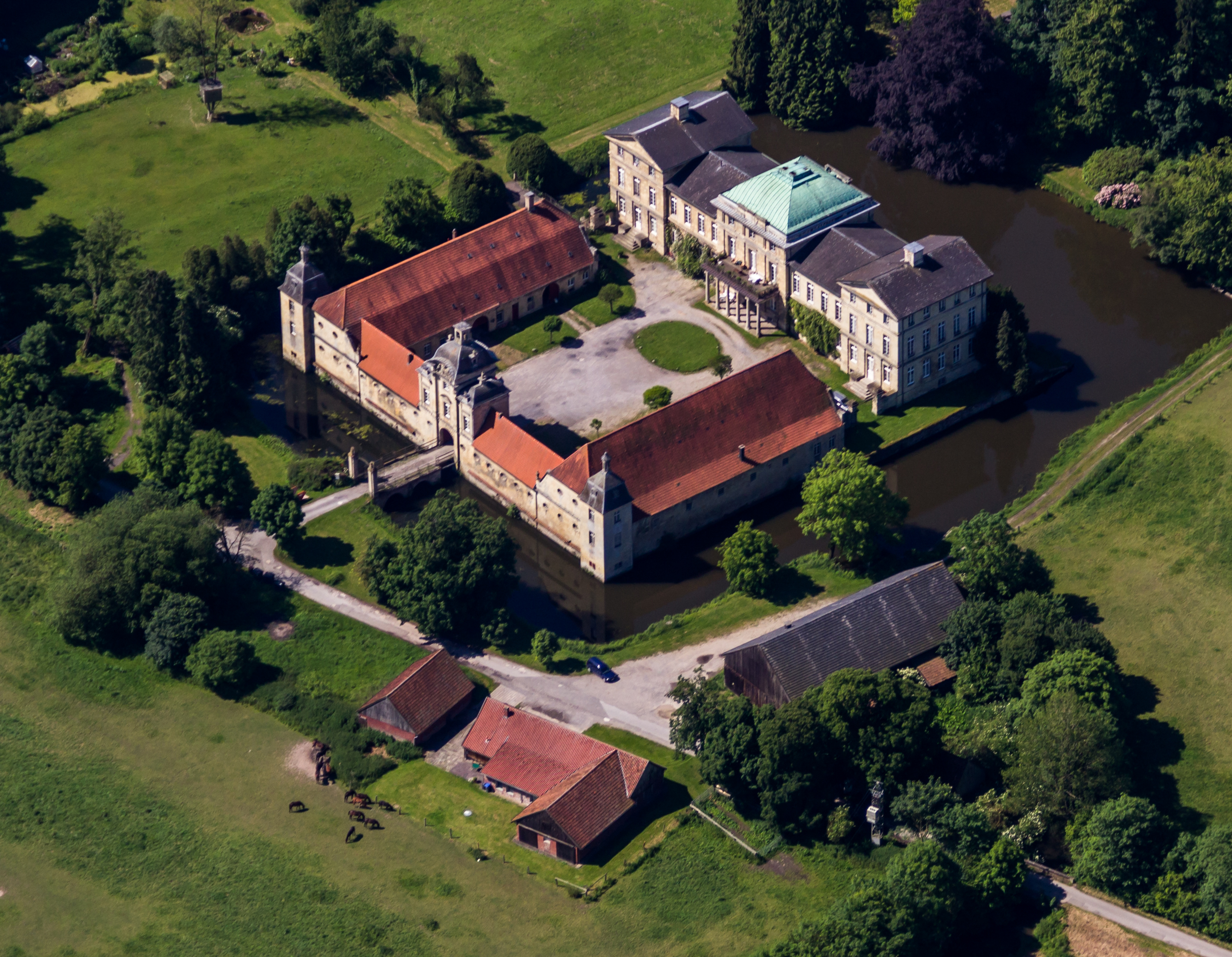
Haus Stapel (Gesamtanlage)

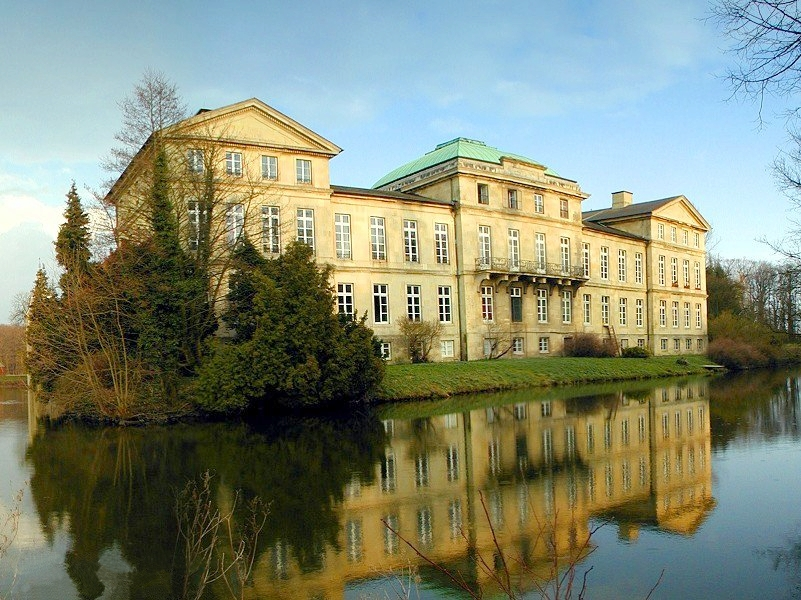
Haus Stapel (Haupthaus)

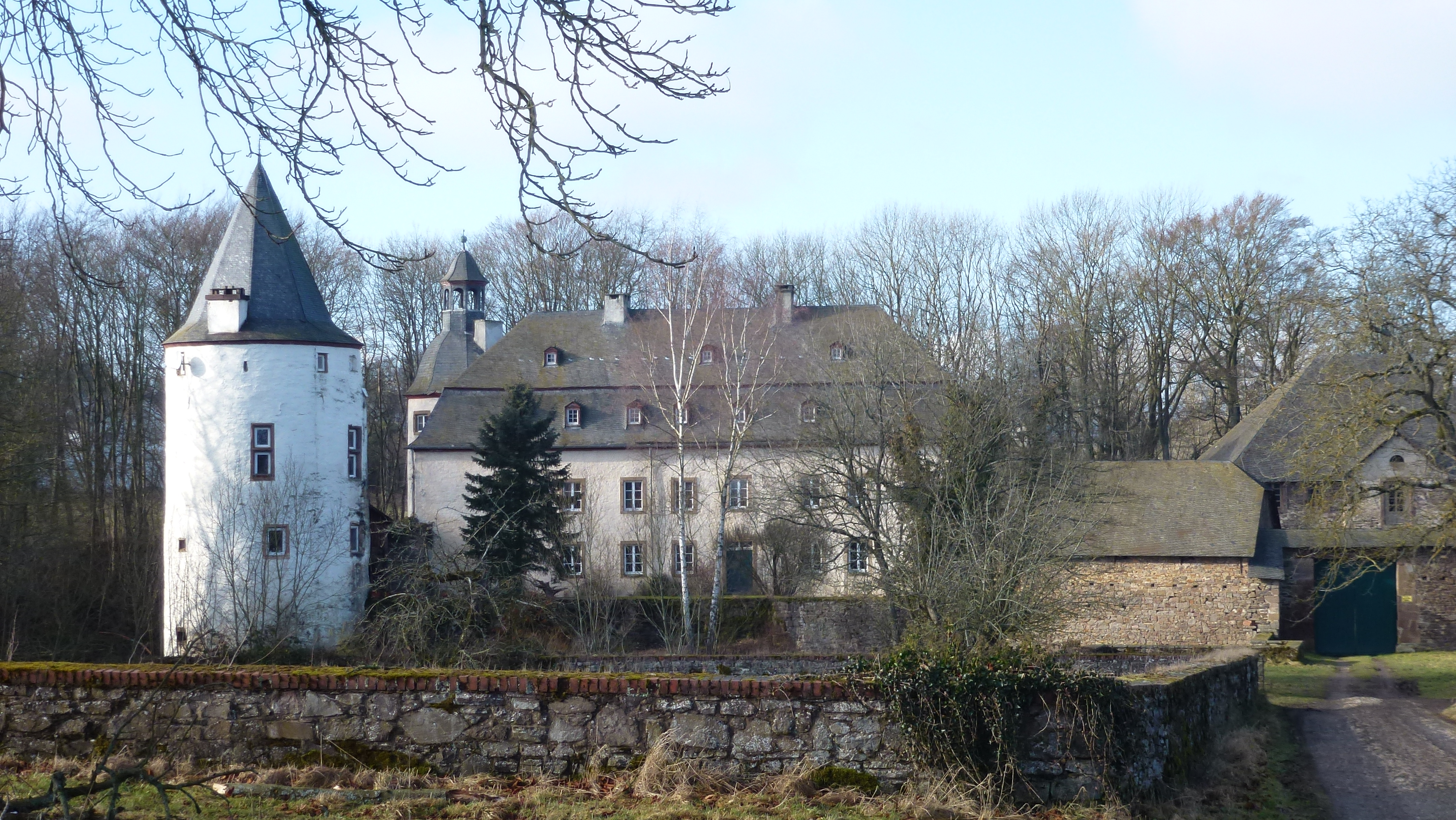
Burg Dreiborn (Eifel)

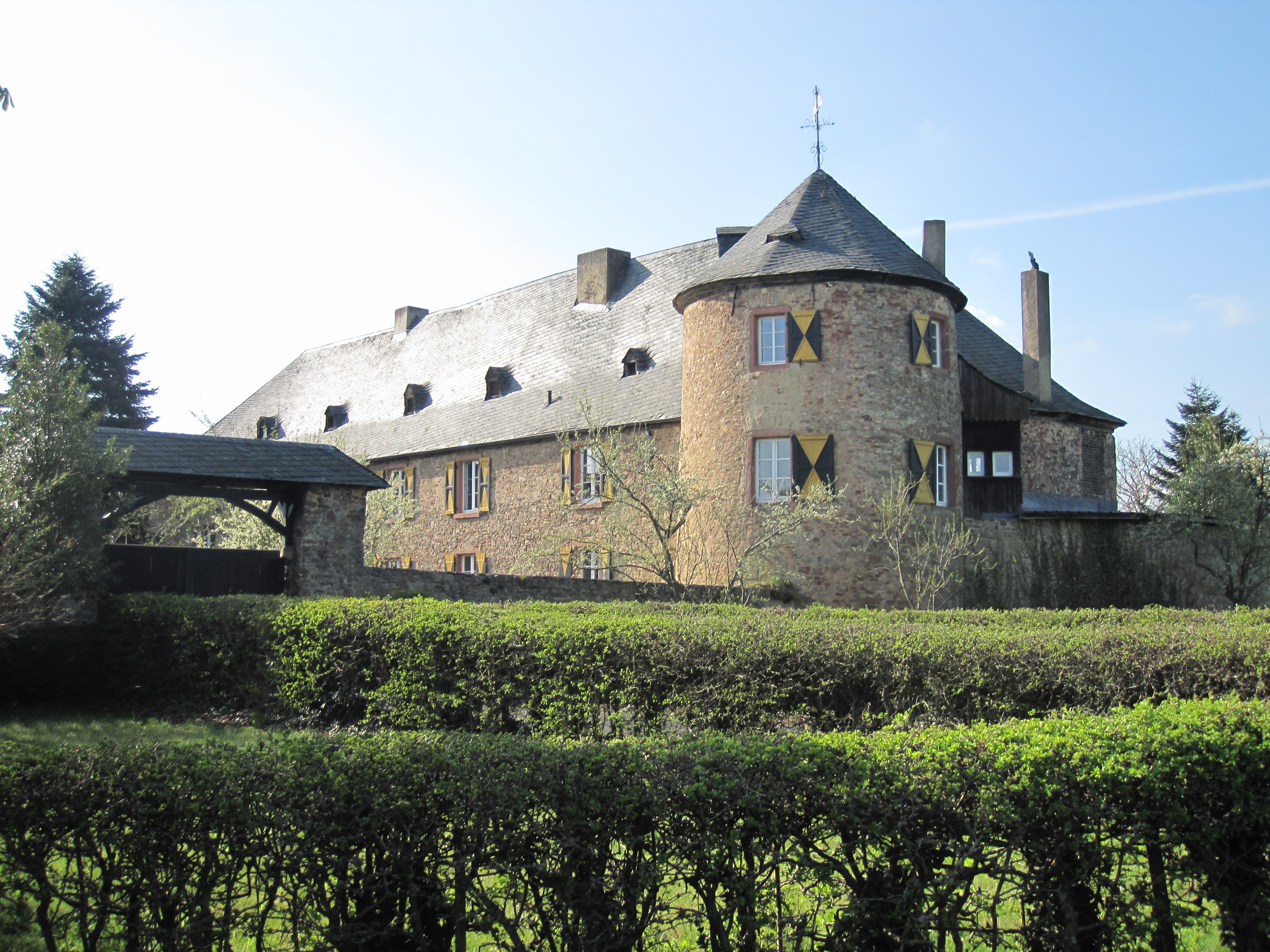
Untere Burg Antweiler (Eifel)

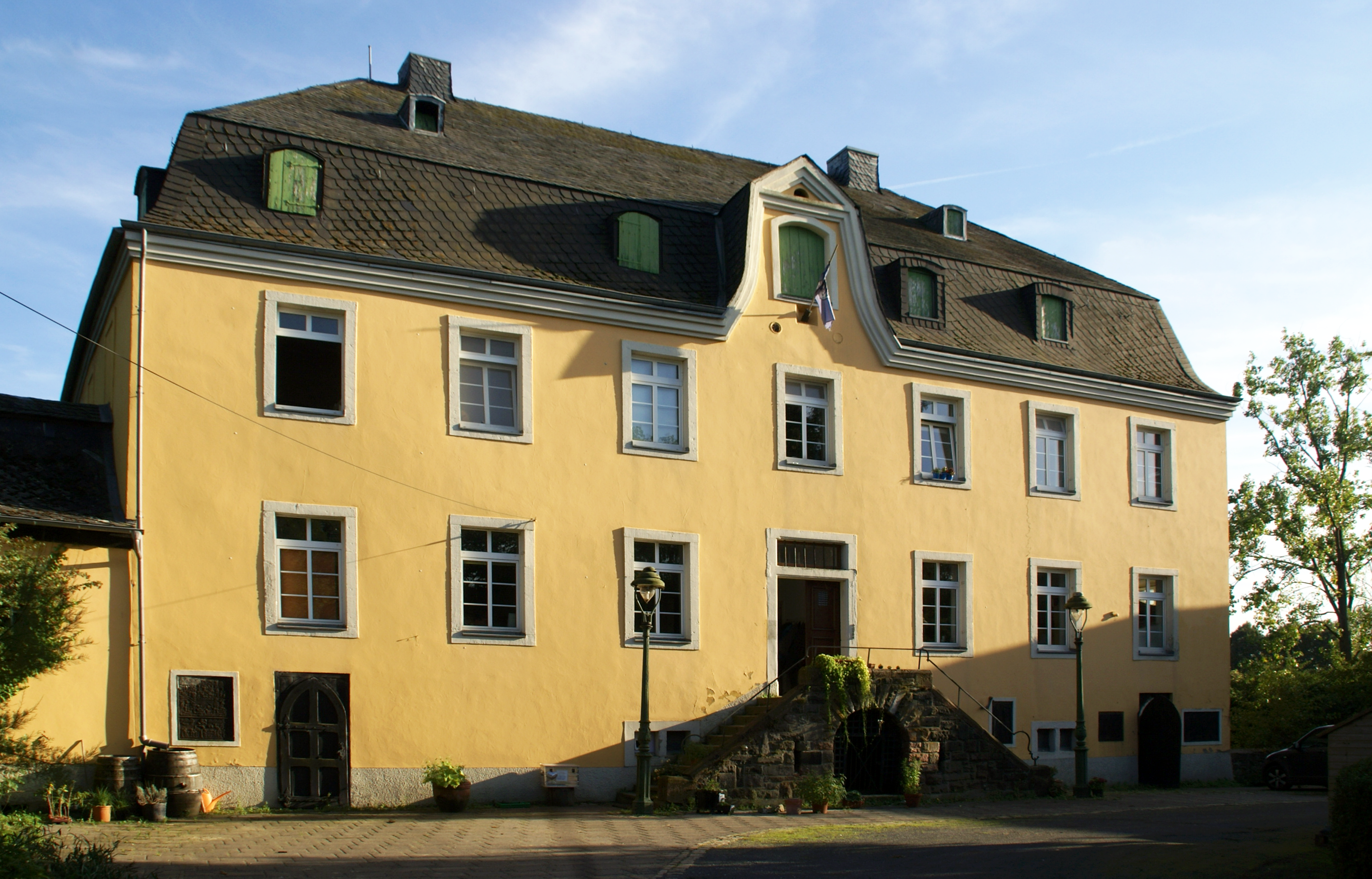
Haus Müttinghoven

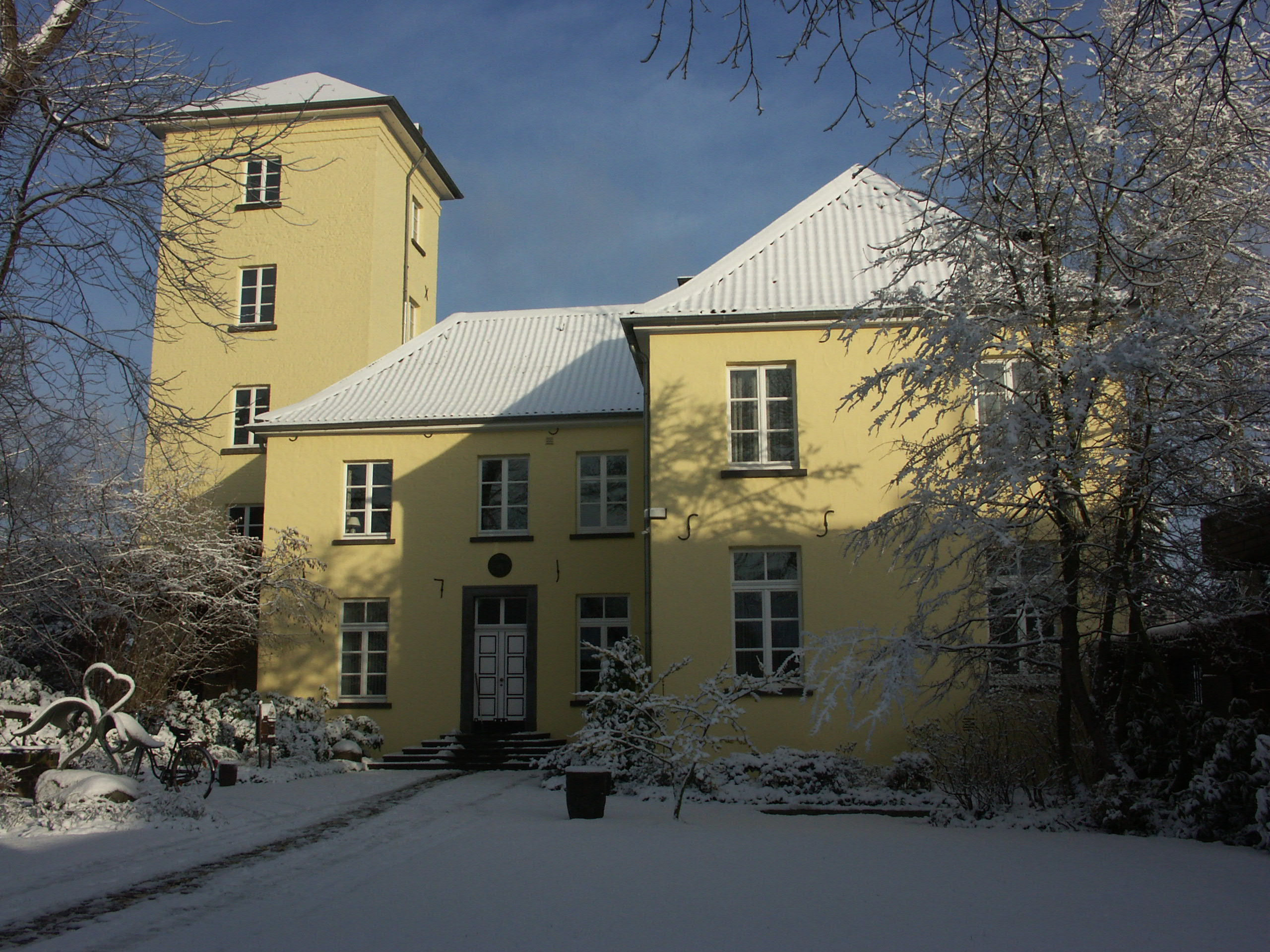
Bakenhof

== Places (formerly owned by the Raitz von Frentz) ==
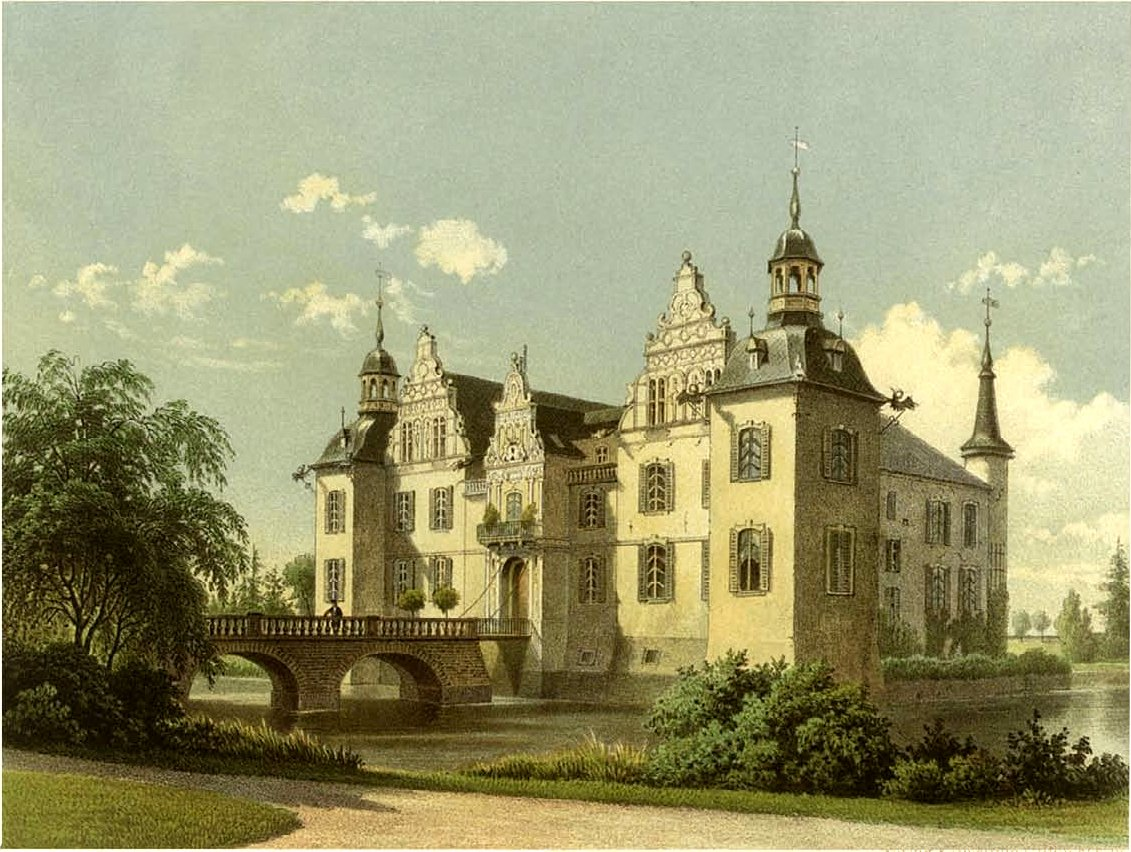

- Lordship and Castle Frentz
- Lordship and Castle Schlenderhan
- Lordship and Castle Stolberg
- Lordship and Castle Fliesteden
- Lordship and Castle Kellenberg
- Lordship and Castle Garath
- Lordship and Castle Hall
- Lordship and Castle Martfeld
- Lordship and Castle Blens
- Lordship and Castle Kendenich
- Lordship and Castle Kühlseggen
- Lordship and Castle Hirschhorn
- Lordship and Castle Elsum
- Lordship and Castle Ulmen
- Lordship and Castle Bachen
- Lordship and Castle Hemmerich
- Lordship and Castle Bießen
- Lordship and Castle Föhren
- Lordship and Castle Odenkirchen
- Lordship and Castle Benatek (Bohemia)
- Lordship and Castle Randerath
- Lordship and Castle Listringhausen
- Lordship and Castle Badinghagen
- Lordship and Castle Paland
- Lordship and Castle Gusdorf
- Lordship and Castle Nagelsgaul
- Lordship and Castle Hausen
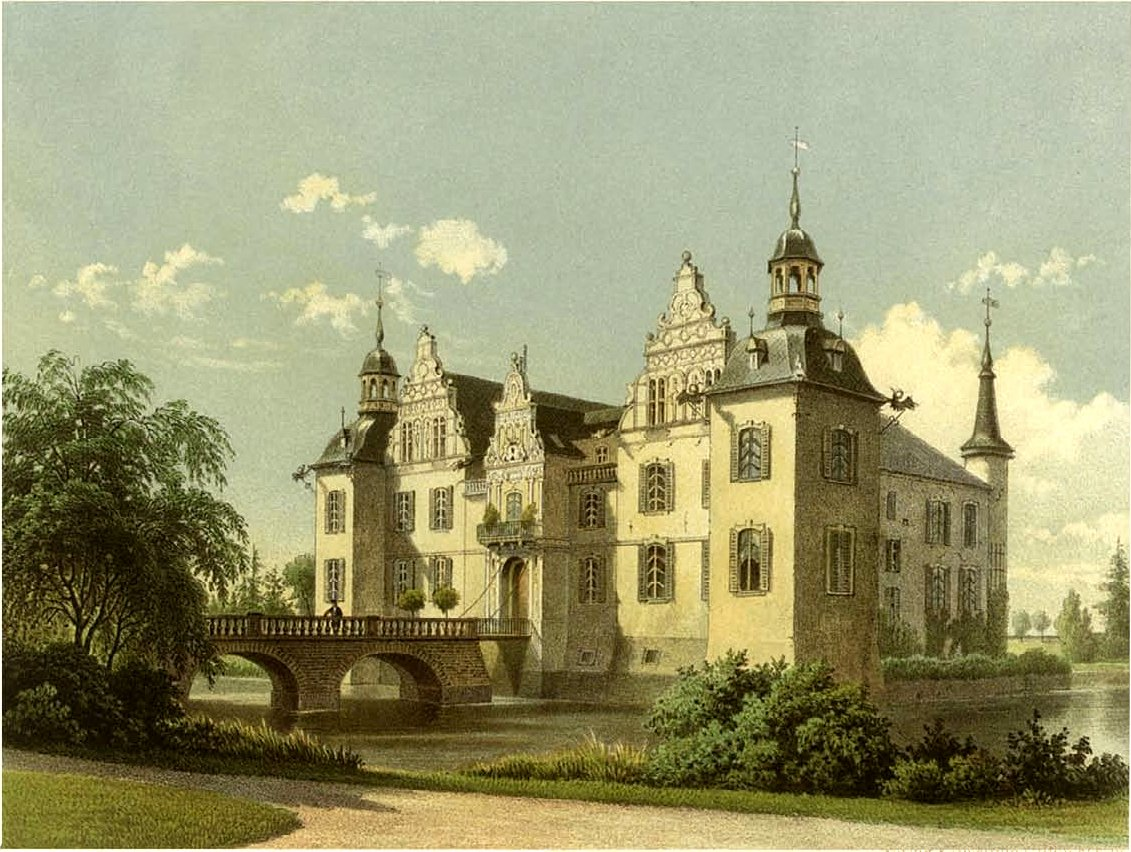

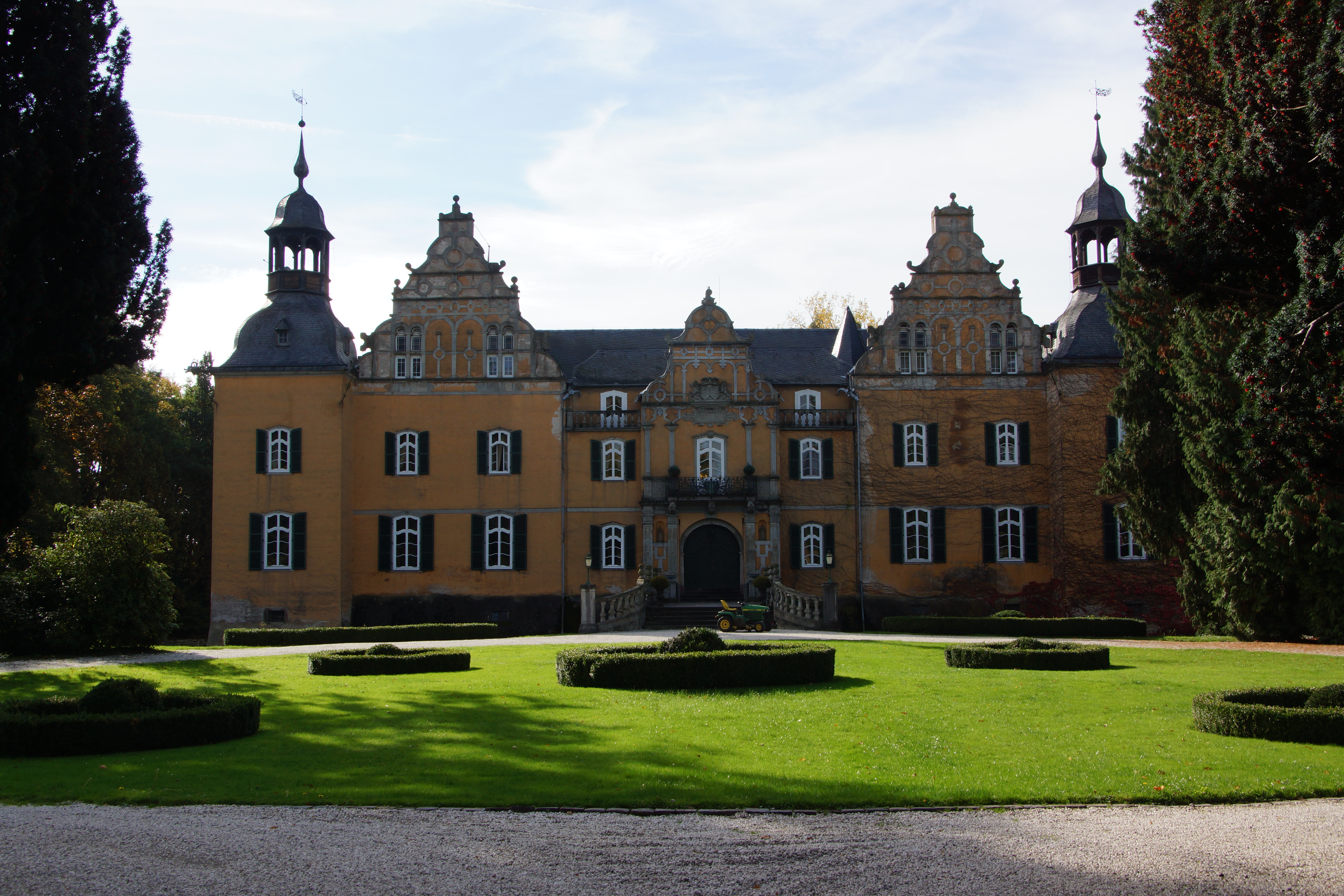
Schloss Frens (Frentz)

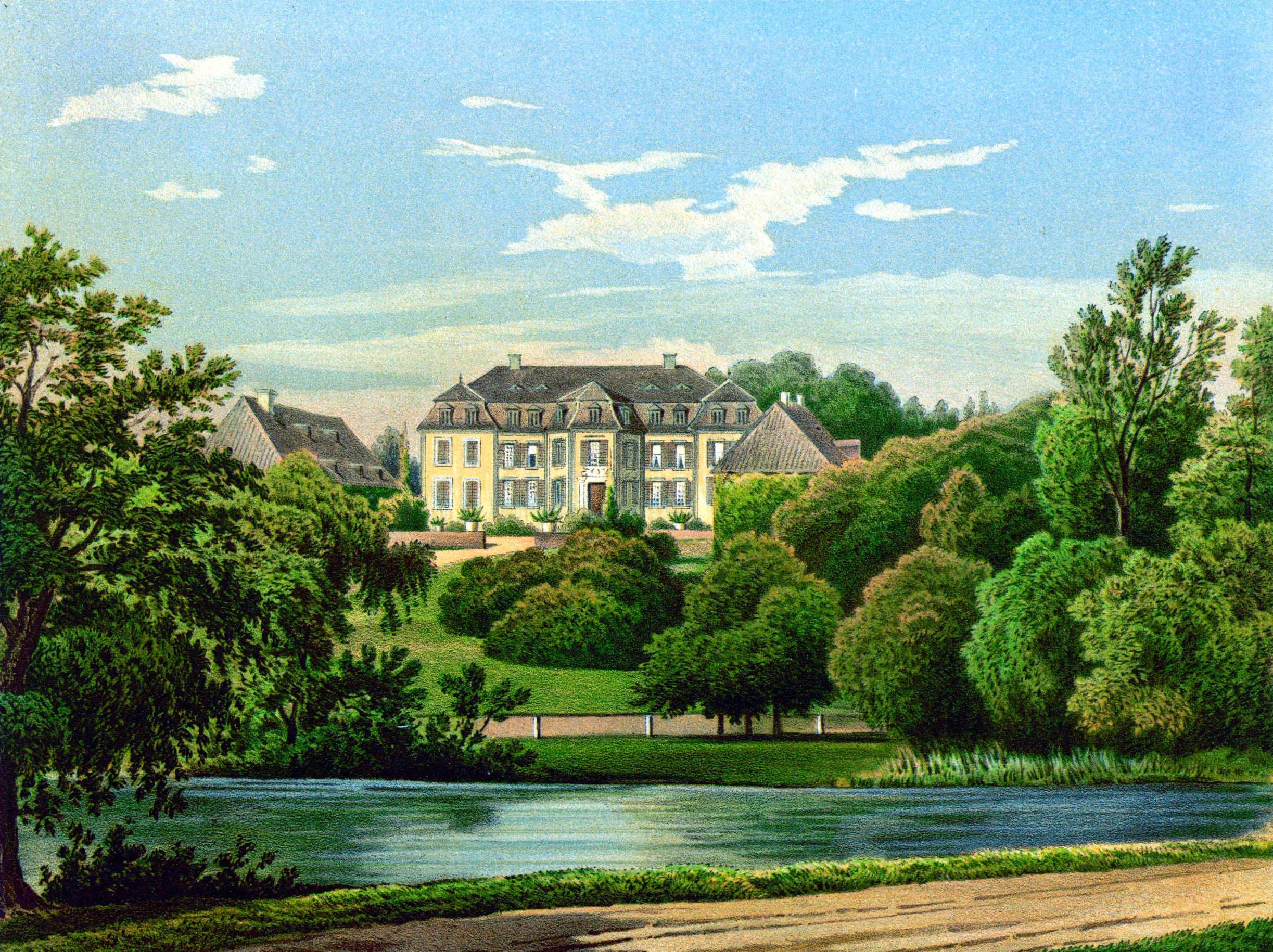
Schloss Schlenderhan

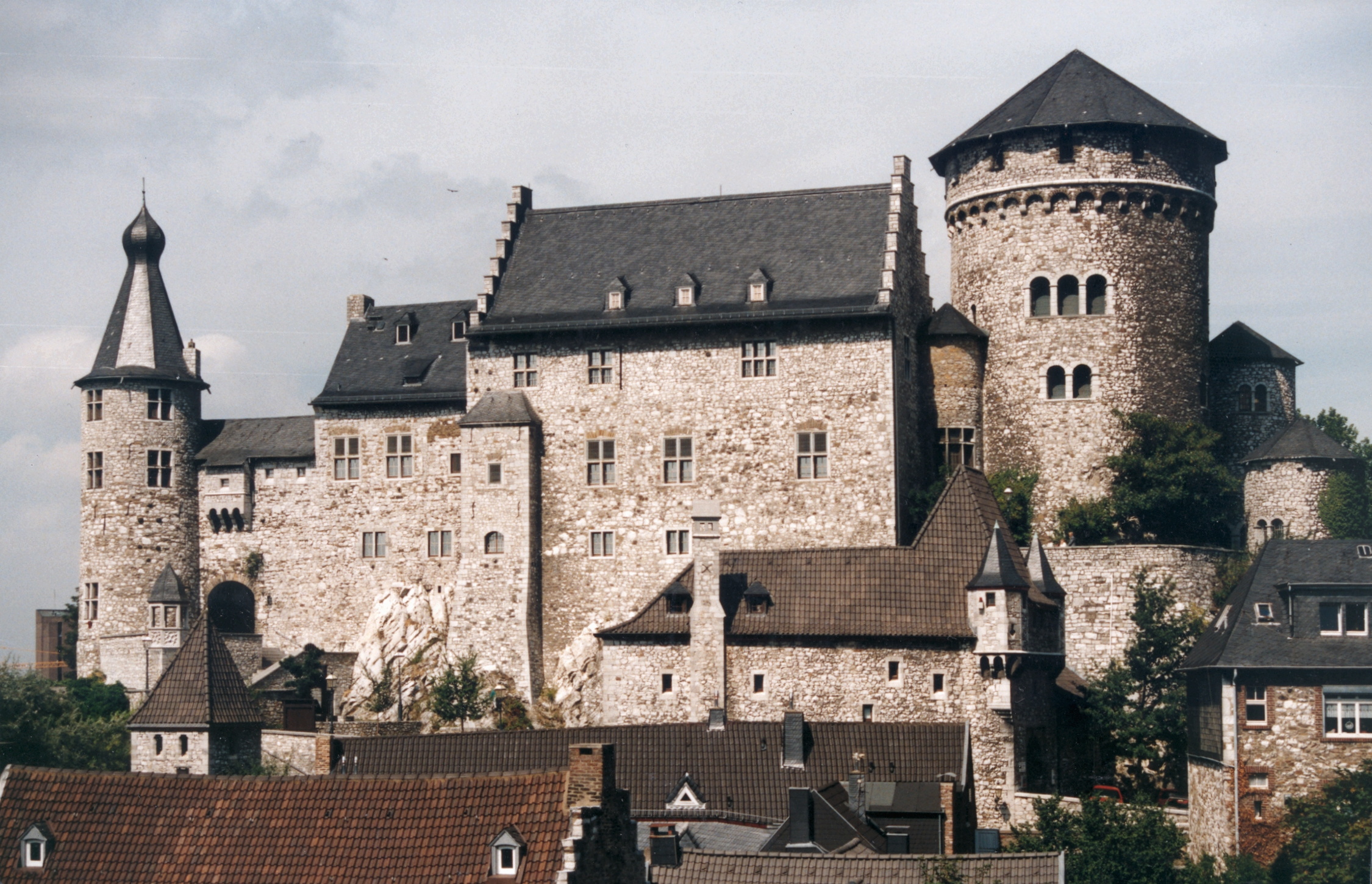
Burg Stolberg

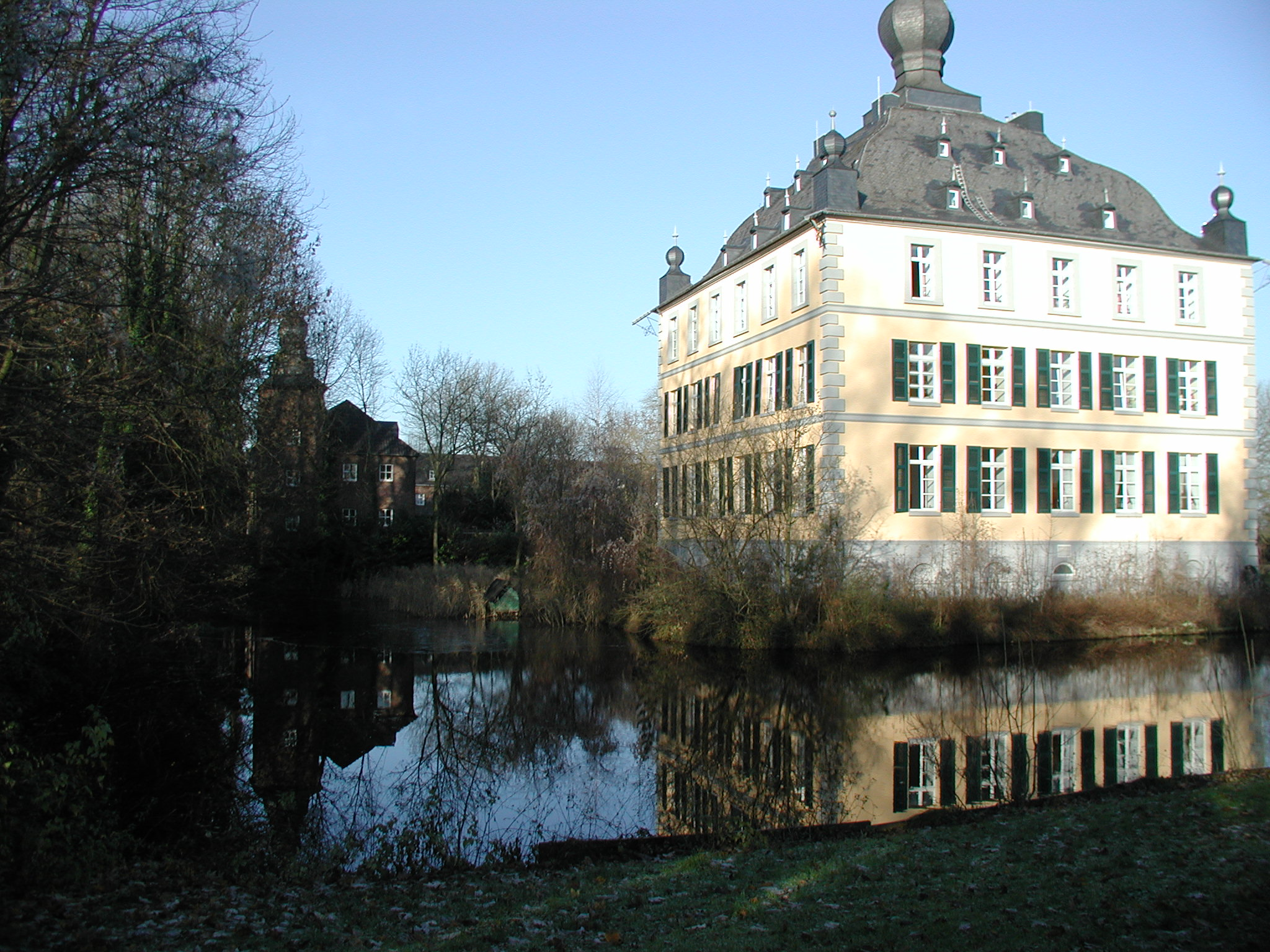
Burg Kendenich

== Members of the Family ==
- Henricus Raitz – "Henricus de foro", mayor of the free imperial city of Cologne (1182), alderman of the Cologne High Court.
- Theodericus Raitz, knight, mayor of the free imperial city of Cologne (1271–1272), alderman, dominus, civis Coloniensis.
- Rutger I. Raitz († 1330), knight, mayor of the free imperial city of Cologne (1305–1306), juryman, member of the council of the free imperial city of Cologne, envoy of the free imperial city of Cologne to the court of Pope John XXII to Avignon. He fought in the Battle of Worringen (1288).
- Johann I. Raitz, Knight, he fought in the Battle of Worringen (1288).
- Tilman (Dietrich IV.) Raitz, Knight, he fought in the battle of Worringen (1288).
- Rutger II Raitz, knight, mayor of the free imperial city of Cologne (1341–1342).
- Rutger III Raitz von Frentz († 1369), Knight, famous war hero under King Philip of Valois, Count Wilhelm III of Holland, Duke of Brabant, King John II of France and King Charles V of France. He took part in a total of 35 so-called "Prussia Travel" (32 winter and 3 summer trips). No other knight has taken more trips to Prussia. His exploits are described in Gelre's work.
- Rutger (V.) Raitz von Frentz, Knight of Odre of Saint Huber; this order was founded on the occasion of the victory in the Battle of Linnich on 3 November 1444. In the Battle of Linnich, Duke Gerhard of Jülich and Berg won against Arnold of Egmond, who seized the Duchy of Geldern. Rutger (V.) Raitz von Frentz was among the heroes rewarded by the Duke after the battle with the knightly order of St. Hubertus, donated by him in memory of this day, on whose feast days the battle had taken place.
- Johann Raitz von Frentz, Commander of the Kommende Ramersdorf of the German Order (1610–1612)
- Johann Raitz von Frentz von und zu Schlenderhan († 1640), Chancellor of the last Duke Johann Wilhelm von Jülich-Kleve-Berg, since 1613 of the Duke of Jülich-Berg, Canon of Liège, Canon of Münster and Speyer, Princely Palatinate-Neuburg Privy Council.
- Arnold Raitz von Frentz von und zu Schlenderhan, Steward of the last Duke Johann Wilhelm von Jülich-Kleve-Berg.
- Adolf Sigismund Baron (of the holy Roman empire) Raitz von Frentz zu Kendenich (Reichsfreiherr since 4 April 1635), House Marshal of the electorate of Cologne; Prime Minister of the electorate of Cologne (1640–1651), bailiff at Hülchrath, since 1620 enfeoffed with the Treasurer's Office of the Arch Abbey of Cologne. (cf. in particular on the office as Landhofmeister: Lutz Jansen: "Schloß Frens – Beiträge zur Kulturgeschichte eines Adelssitzes an der Erft", Verein für Geschichte und Heimatkunde Quadrath-Ichendorf e.V., Bergheim 2008, page 107 m.w.N.; Landschaftsverband Rheinland – LVR-Archivberatungs- und Fortbildungszentrum: Die Urkunden von Schloß Frens – Regesten, Volume II: 1566–1649, Inventories of non-state archives 51 – 2011, pages 349 ff.m.N.)
- Ferdinand Baron (of the holy Roman empire) Raitz von Frentz zu Kendenich, hereditary treasurer, secret counsellor and since 1647 also colonel of the Arch Abbey of Cologne.
- Maria Adriana Raitz of Frentz, prince abbess of the free Imperial Abbey Burtscheid (1614–1616).
- Anna Raitz von Frentz, prince abbess of the free imperial abbey of Burtscheid (1616–1639).
- Henriette (Henrica) Baroness (of the holy Roman empire) Raitz von Frentz, prince abbess of the free imperial abbey of Burtscheid (1639–1674).
- Johanna Baroness (of the holy Roman empire) Raitz von Frentz, prince abbess of the free imperial abbey of Burtscheid (1675–1676).
- Winand Hieronymus Baron (of the holy Roman empire) Raitz von Frentz von und zu Schlenderhan (* 1613), (Baron since 1650), Burgrave of the electorate Cologne (since 1652), Burgrave of Odenkirchen (since 1652), Lord of Schlenderhan, Kellenberg, Hattenheim, Kleinenbroich, Randerath ec.
- Arnold Baron (of the holy Roman empire) Raitz von Frentz von und zu Schlenderhan, (Baron since 1650), Canon of Liège and Speyer.
- Lambertina Irmgardis Baroness (of the holy Roman empire) Raitz von Frentz von und zu Schlenderhan, Countess of Odenkirchen, married since 1. December 1647 with Winand Hieronymus Baron Raitz von Frentz von und zu Schlenderhan, Burgrave of Odenkirchen, née Baroness (of the holy Roman empire) and Burgrave von Werth, daughter of the famous and popular rider general Johann Baron (of the holy Roman empire) und Burgraf von Werth, called Jan von Werth.
- Franz Carl Anton Johann Nepomuk Freiherr Raitz von Frentz von und zu Schlenderhan (* 15 April 1763; † 6 August 1821), Knight and Grand Cross of the Red Eagle Order 1st Class, Lord on Schlenderhan, Kleinenbroich, Hattenheim, Listringhausen, Badinghagen, Paz, Genkel, Hesmike, Neuenhof and Meulengrind.
- Emmerich Anton Hubert Maria Baron Raitz von Frentz (* 16 March 1803; † 30 December 1874), captain of the Rhenish Knighthood, Governor of Benrath, Lord on Garath, District Administrator of Düsseldorf
- Jakob Franz Hubert Baron Raitz von Frentz (* Cologne 30 May 1826; † Koblenz 26 September 1884), Member of the Reichstag of the Norddeutsche Bundes (since 1867 – he was already a member of his constituent meeting), President and member of the Rhenish Provincial Parliament, member of the Prussian House of Representatives, Governor of Stolzenfels, District Administrator, Police Commissioner.
- Emmerich Leopold Karl Maria Hubert Baron Raitz von Frentz (* 18 December 1857; † 13 April 1930), royal Prussian lieutenant general.
- Josef August Karl Jakob Maria Hubert Baron Raitz von Frentz (* 11 August 1858; † 6 February 1922), Honorary Knight of the Sovereign Order of Malta, Royal Prussian lieutenant general.
- Maximilian Nikolaus Hubert Baron Raitz von Frentz (* 5 December 1880; † 28 November 1963), lieutenant general.
- Jakobus-Maximilian Edmund Josef Hubert Maria Baron Raitz von Frentz (* 7 July 1885; † 21 August 1967), Senate President at the Administrative Court of Rhineland-Palatinate, District Administrator of Koblenz, District Administrator of Lippstadt.
- Edmund Erwin Joseph Hubert Maria Baron Raitz von Frentz (* 18 July 1887; † 2 November 1964), papal secretary di spada e cappa, honorary knight of the sovereign Order of Malta, Grand Cross of the Constantine Order of St. George, writer and journalist.
- Emmerich Friedrich Karl Thaddäus Sigmund Maximilian Hubertus Maria Freiherr Raitz von Frentz (* 8 December 1889; † 19 May 1968), priest of Societas Jesu, known Jesuit and author of various theological writings, including Selbstverleugnung – Eine asketische Betrachtung, 1936, Benziger & Co. AG, Einsiedeln.
- Irmgard Baroness Raitz von Frentz (* 31 May 1912; † 23 November 1998), née von Bohlen und Halbach, daughter of Gustav Krupp von Bohlen und Halbach, chairman of the Supervisory Board of Friedrich Krupp AG, and Bertha Krupp von Bohlen und Halbach, née Krupp. Irmgard Freifrau Raitz von Frentz married the Bavarian farmer Robert Eilenstein (1920–1986) in her second marriage, after the death of her first husband Johann (Hanno) Baron Raitz von Frentz, on 19 June 1952.
