= Rittersturm =

Event in German history

The so-called Rittersturm (lit. 'knight storm') was the illegal seizure of the Imperially immediate territories of the Imperial Knights within the Holy Roman Empire by some Imperial Estates in 1802–1804.

In 1803, under the new political structures imposed by the final resolution of the Holy Roman Empire, the Reichsdeputationshauptschluss, the Imperial Knights (Reichsritterschaften should have remain untouched, unlike the ecclesial prince-bishoprics which were forcibly secularised. But by the winter of 1802/1803, the territorial states of Bavaria, Hesse-Kassel and Württemberg attempted to take possession of the tiny and fragmented estates belonging to the neighbouring Imperial Knights through a combination of Surrender and Transfer Edicts (Abtretungs- und Überweisungspatente) and military force.

In autumn 1803 the majority of the roughly 300 knightly estates were de facto annexed by their larger neighbours. In the winter of 1803/1804 the Princes of Leiningen, Hohenlohe and Löwenstein followed suit. The annexing powers often had competing claims. Baden, Hesse-Darmstadt, Leiningen and Bavaria each sent troops to occupy parts of the estates of the Freiherr von Massenbach late in 1803. Massenbach territory ultimately fell to Württemberg in May 1807.

The measures were denounced by the knights to the Reichshofrat and, in January 1804, pronounced as illegal by Emperor Francis II. The emperor empowered the states of Austria, Baden, Saxony and Regensburg (Mainz) to enforce his decision. Although Francis was not practically able to reverse many of the annexations, the threat of force put a stop to the Rittersturm. In 1806, with the end of the Empire, the formal mediatisation of the baronies was concluded. Article 25 of the Treaty of the Confederation of the Rhine sanctioned unilateral action by territorial states.

== Literature ==
- Klaus Epstein. The Genesis of German Conservatism. Princeton, NJ: Princeton University Press, 1966.
- Albert Funk. Kleine Geschichte des Föderalismus: Vom Fürstenbund zur Bundesrepublik. Verlag Ferd. Schöningh GmbH & Co. KG, 2010.
- John G. Gagliardo. Reich and Nation: The Holy Roman Empire as Idea and Reality, 1763–1806. Indiana University Press, 1980.
- William D. Godsey. Nobles and Nation in Central Europe: Free Imperial Knights in the Age of Revolution, 1750–1850. Cambridge: Cambridge University Press, 2004.
- Volker Himmelein and Hans Ulrich Rudolf. Alte Klöster - Neue Herren, Ausstellungskatalog, vol. 2. Thorbecke Verlag, 2003.
- Joachim Whaley. Germany and the Holy Roman Empire, vol. 2. Oxford University Press, 2012,
- Peter H. Wilson, "Bolstering the Prestige of the Habsburgs: The End of the Holy Roman Empire in 1806", The International History Review, 28:4 (2006), 709–36.
- Peter H. Wilson. Heart of Europe: A History of the Holy Roman Empire. Cambridge, MA: Belknap Press, 2016.
