= Albrecht von Eyb =

German humanist (1420–1475)

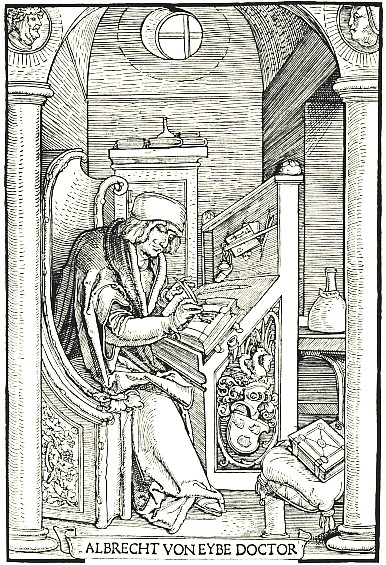
Albrecht von Eyb from a 1521 wood print.

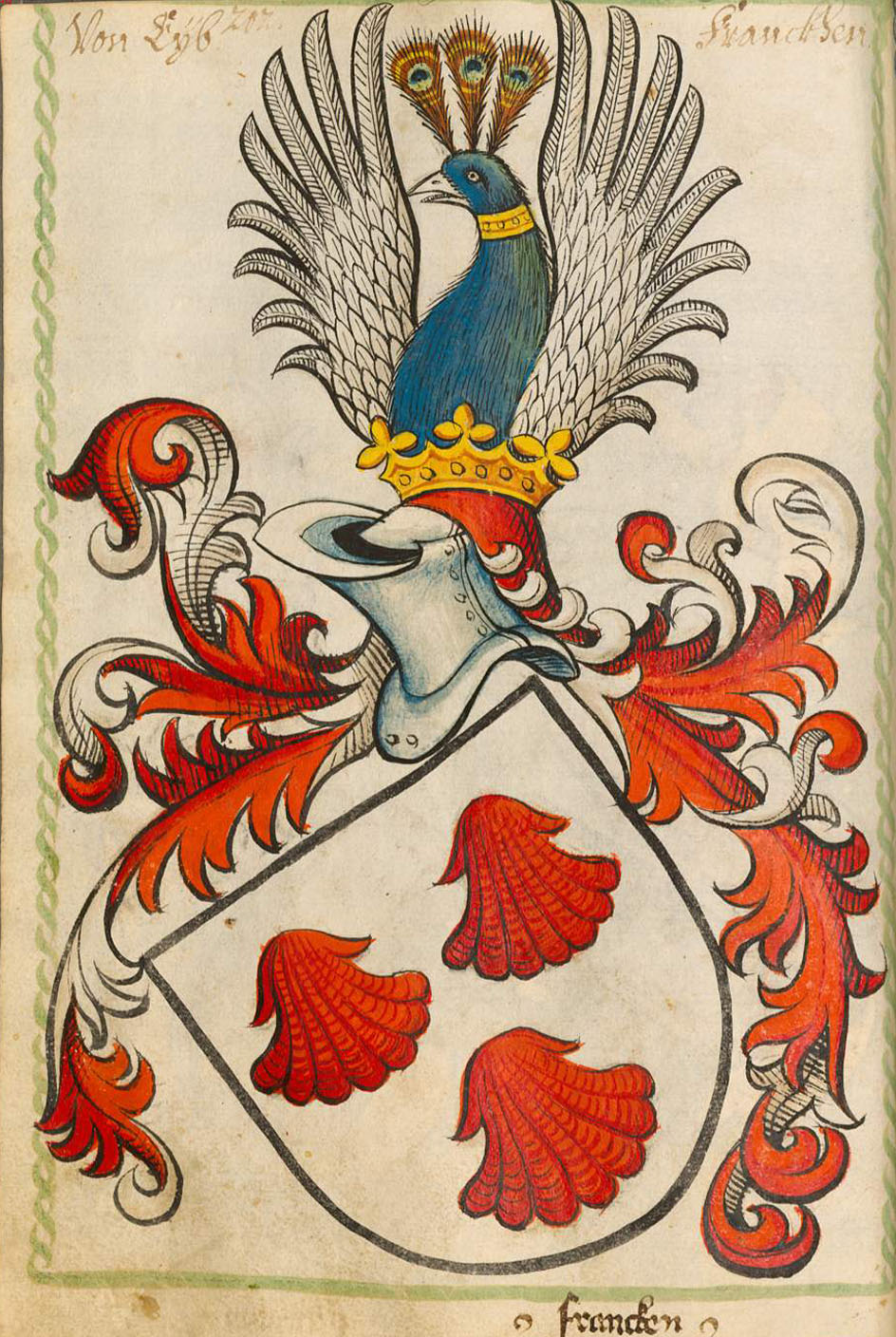
Eyb family coat of arms

Albrecht von Eyb (August 24, 1420 – July 24, 1475) was one of the earliest German humanists.

== Life ==
Eyb was born in the Sommersdorf castle near Ansbach in Franconia. After preliminary studies at Erfurt, he went to Italy and devoted himself to humanistic study at the University of Pavia and University of Bologna. He returned to Germany in 1451, having in the meantime been appointed canon at Eichstätt and Bamberg.

From 1452 to 1459 he was again a student at Bologna, winning the degree of doctor of canon and civil law. He was also honoured by an appointment as chamberlain to Pope Pius II. After his return to Germany he resided chiefly at Eichstätt. In 1462 he became archdeacon of Würzburg, not, however, without encountering violent opposition from the Bishop of Würzburg, who hated Eyb as a partisan of the Hohenzollern Margrave, Albrecht Achilles. Little is known of his last years.

== Works ==
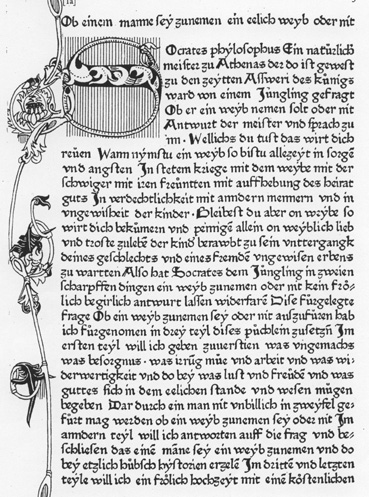
Albrecht von Eyb, Ob einem manne sey zunemen ein eelich weyb oder nit, Nuremberg 1472.

Eyb's best known and most important work is his Ehebüchlein (Book on Marriage), in which he discusses the question whether a man should take a lawful wife or not. It was published in 1472. In 1460 he had written on the same theme in Latin "An viro sapienti uxor sit ducenda". The German work treats of the joys and sorrows of married life and general maxims of a moral or philosophical character are added. A decision is finally rendered in favour of the married state. The popularity of the book is attested by the fact that between 1472 and 1540 no less than twelve reprints were issued.

Another work of Eyb is the Margarita poetica (Nuremberg, 1472), a textbook of humanistic rhetoric, consisting of a collection of passages in prose and verse from Latin authors, to which are added specimens of humanistic eloquence. In 1474 Eyb finished his Spiegel der Sitten (Mirror of Morals), a lengthy work of ethical and moral content, probably based on some Latin original. The book did not meet with the favour shown to the Ehebüchlein and was not printed until 1511. Appended to it are German translations of two of Plautus's comedies, the Menaechmi and the Bacchides as well as of Ugolini Pisani's Philogenia.

Eyb's writings have been edited by K. Müller (Sondershausen, 1879) and M. Herrmann, "Deutsche Schriften des Albrecht von Eyb" (Berlin, 1895).
