= List of wars involving the Holy Roman Empire =

This is a list of wars involving the Holy Roman Empire (HRE) (962–1806), since 1512 also known as the Holy Roman Empire of the German Nation (German: Heiliges Römisches Reich Deutscher Nation, Latin: Sacrum Imperium Romanum Nationis Germanicæ).

Victory
Defeat
Another result

== Holy Roman Empire (962–1806) ==
Conflict and date	Combatant 1	Combatant 2	Result	Ruling King/Emperor
Otto I's raid on Poland (963)	Holy Roman Empire	Duchy of Poland	Victory	Otto I
Rebellion of Harald Bluetooth	Holy Roman Empire; Norwegian Rebels	Kingdom of Denmark; Kingdom of Norway	Victory	Otto II
Franco-German War of 978-980	Holy Roman Empire	West Francia	Status quo ante bellum	Otto II
Otto II's raid on Poland	Holy Roman Empire	Civitas Schinesghe	Defeat	Otto II
Slavic revolt of 983	Holy Roman Empire	Wends Lutici; Obotrite	Defeat	Otto II
Polish-Saxon Invasion of Veleti (985)	Duchy of Poland; Holy Roman Empire	Veleti	Victory	Otto III
Polish-Bohemian War (990)	Duchy of Poland; Holy Roman Empire	Duchy of Bohemia	Victory	Otto III
Polish-German invasion of Veleti (992)	Duchy of Poland; Holy Roman Empire	Veleti	Victory	Otto III
Polish-German invasion of Obotrites (995)	Duchy of Poland; Holy Roman Empire	Obotrites	Victory	Otto III
German–Polish War (1003–1018)	Holy Roman Empire	Duchy of Poland	Peace of Bautzen	Henry II
Bolesław I's intervention in the Kievan succession crisis (1015–1019)	Duchy of Poland (Holy Roman Empire) Holy Roman Empire; Pechenegs	Kievan Rus'	Victory: Temporary victory for Sviatopolk and Boleslaw; Polish sack of Kiev	Henry II
German–Polish War (1028–1031)	Holy Roman Empire: Duchy of Saxony; Duchy of Bohemia (from 1029); Kievan Rus' (from 1030); Kingdom of Hungary (1031)	Kingdom of Poland; Kingdom of Hungary (1029–1031)	Victory	Conrad II
Emperor Conrad II's military campaign against Hungary (1030–1031)	Holy Roman Empire	Kingdom of Hungary	Defeat: The Hungarians occupied Vienna	Conrad II
German-Hungarian Wars (1042–1043)	Holy Roman Empire	Kingdom of Hungary	Victory	Henry III
Henry III's military campaign against Hungary (1044)	Holy Roman Empire Peter Orseolo and his allies	The army of King Samuel Aba	Victory: Defeat of Samuel Aba, restoration of Peter	Henry III
War between King Peter and Prince Andrew (1046)	King Peter's army Holy Roman Empire	Prince Andrew's army Kievan Rus'	Defeat	Henry III
Emperor Henry III's military campaigns against Hungary (1051–1052)	Holy Roman Empire Duchy of Bohemia	Kingdom of Hungary	Defeat	Henry III
German-Hungarian border War (1056–1058)	Holy Roman Empire	Kingdom of Hungary	Stalemate: treaty of Marchfeld	Henry IV
Civil War between King Andrew I and his brother, Prince Bela (1060)	King Andrew I's army Holy Roman Empire	Prince Béla's army Kingdom of Poland	Defeat	Henry IV
German invasion of Hungary (1063)	Holy Roman Empire: Duchy of Bavaria	Kingdom of Hungary	Victory	Henry IV
Saxon revolt of 1077–1088	Holy Roman Empire	German rebels: Duchy of Saxony; Duchy of Bavaria; County of Luxembourg	Victory	Henry IV
German-Flemish war	Holy Roman Empire	County of Flanders	Status quo ante bellum	Henry V
Henry V's expedition to Poland	Holy Roman Empire; Duchy of Bohemia	Kingdom of Poland	Defeat	Henry V
War of Bohemian Succession (1125–1140)	Holy Roman Empire	Duchy of Bohemia	Defeat	Lothair III
Wars of the Guelphs and Ghibellines: 1125–1186; 1216–1392	Ghibellines': Holy Roman Empire; 1st phase: Holy Roman Empire; 2nd phase: Staufen (Empire); Pro-Staufen Sicily; March of Treviso; County of Urbino; Pro-Ghibelline Florence; Pro-Ghibelline Milan led by Della Torre; Pro-Ghibelline Milan led by Visconti; Republic of Siena; Republic of Lucca; Republic of Pisa; Duchy of Modena; Republic of Massa; Pro-Ghibelline Montferrat; Pavia; Commune of Terni; Asti; Todi; Santa Fiora; Variable Italian city-states; Empire of Nicaea	Guelphs': Holy See (Papacy); 1st phase: (Milan) Lombard League; 2nd phase: Welfen (Empire); Pro-Angevin Sicily; Papal States; Pro-Guelph Florence; Pro-Guelph Milan led by Della Torre; Pro-Guelph Milan led by Visconti; House of Della Torre; Commune of Bologna; Republic of Siena; Republic of Lucca; Republic of Genoa; March of Ferrara; Republic of Massa; Pro-Guelph Montferrat; County of Savoy; Republic of Ancona; Patriarchate of Aquileia; Lodi; Perugia; Mantua; Orvieto; Variable Italian city-states	1st phase:Peace of Constance (1186) 2nd phase:Stalemate (1392): Decline of free communes;rise of signorie; Diffusion of Black Death; Extinction of Hohenstaufen dynasty; Conquest of the Kingdom of Sicily by Charles of Anjou; Interregnum after Frederick II's death; Weakening of Imperial Authority over Italy	Frederick I Barbarossa Frederick II Henry VII Louis IV
German–Polish War	Holy Roman Empire Duchy of Bohemia	Mieszko III the Old	Mieszko III the Old's victory/Roman defeat	Conrad III of Germany
Wendish Crusade (1147)	Crusaders: Holy Roman Empire; Bishopric of Havelberg; March of Meissen; March of Brandenburg; Duchy of Saxony; Archbishopric of Bremen; Archbishopric of Mainz; Bishopric of Halberstadt; County of Holstein; Bishopric of Münster; Bishopric of Olmütz; Bishopric of Brandenburg; Bishopric of Merseburg; Jutland-Kingdom of Denmark; Zealand/Scania-Kingdom of Denmark; Kingdom of Poland	Wends: Obotrite Confederacy; Obotrites; Wagrians; Liutizian Confederacy Wendish allies: Duchy of Pomerania	Victory: March of Brandenburg reconquers Havelberg, County of Holstein expels its Wends	Conrad III of Germany
Second Crusade (1147–1150)	Holy Roman Empire Other Crusaders	Emirate of Damascus other Muslim and Pagan entities in East Central Europe, Iberia and the Near East.	Victories in East Central Europe and Iberia. Defeat in the Holy Land.	Conrad III of Germany
Frederick I's expedition to Głogów	Holy Roman Empire; Duchy of Bohemia	Kingdom of Poland; Cumania; Old Prussians	Victory	Frederick I Barbarossa
Henry VI's conquest of Sicily	Holy Roman Empire	Kingdom of Sicily	Victory	Henry VI
Third Crusade (1189–1192)	Holy Roman Empire Other Crusaders	Ayyubids	Small Gains for the Crusaders. Jerusalem stays under Ayyubid control.	Frederick I Barbarossa
Fourth Crusade (1202–1204)	Crusaders from: Kingdom of France: County of Blois; County of Brienne; County of Champagne; County of Flanders; County of Saint-Pol; Holy Roman Empire: March of Montferrat; County of Hainaut; Republic of Venice	In Europe: Byzantine Empire; Kingdom of Hungary; Kingdom of Croatia; Holy Land: Ayyubid Sultanate	Victory	Otto IV
Prussian Crusade	Holy Roman Empire Other Crusaders	Baltic pagans: Prussians; Bartians; Galindians; Natangians; Nadruvians; Pomesanians; Pogesanians; Sambians; Warmians; Yotvingians (Sudovians); Skalvians; Allies of Prussians: Grand Duchy of Lithuania; Duchy of Pomerania	Victory: Teutonic Knights gain control of Prussia	Frederick II
Fifth Crusade (1217–1221)	Crusaders: Holy Roman Empire; Kingdom of Portugal; Kingdom of Hungary; Kingdom of France; Levant: Kingdom of Jerusalem; Kingdom of Cyprus; Latin Empire; Military orders: Knights Templar; Teutonic Order; (Sovereign Military Order of Malta) Knights Hospitaller	Muslim forces: Ayyubids	Defeat	Frederick II
Anglo-French War (1213–1214)	Angevin Empire: Kingdom of England; County of Anjou; Duchy of Normandy; Duchy of Aquitaine; Holy Roman Empire County of Flanders County of Boulogne	Kingdom of France	Defeat	Otto IV
Sixth Crusade (1227–1229)	Holy Roman Empire including in Personal Union: Kingdom of Sicily; Kingdom of Jerusalem	Ayyubids	Kingdom of Jerusalem regains Jerusalem through peaceful negotiations.	Frederick II
War of the Lombards	Holy Roman Empire; Pro-Imperial faction in the Kingdom of Jerusalem: Tyre; Jerusalem; Principality of Antioch and County of Tripoli; Republic of Pisa; Knights Hospitaller; Teutonic Knights	Kingdom of Cyprus; Anti-Imperial faction in the Kingdom of Jerusalem: Acre; Beirut; Arsuf; Caesarea; Republic of Genoa; Knights Templar; Papacy	Defeat	Frederick II
Great Interregnum 1245/50–1273/5	Hohenstaufen party: Frederick II (1245–50); Conrad IV (1245–54); Alfonso X of Castile (1257–75); Rudolf of Habsburg (1273–5)	Welf party: Henry of Thuringia (1246–7); William II of Holland (1247–56); Richard of Cornwall (1257–72); Ottokar II of Bohemia	Compromise: Unanimous election of Rudolf of Habsburg in 1273; Alfonso X of Castile renounced claim in 1275	
Hussite Wars (1419–1434)	Catholic Church, Crusades and Loyalists: Holy Roman Empire	Bohemian Wars: Hussite Movement	Eventual defeat for Radical Hussites, Victory for Moderate Hussites and Catholics	Sigismund
Austrian–Hungarian War (1477–1488)	Holy Roman Empire	Kingdom of Hungary	Defeat	Frederick III
Austrian–Hungarian War (1490–91)	Holy Roman Empire	Kingdom of Hungary	Victory: Peace of Pressburg (1491)	Frederick III
Italian War of 1494–1498	1494: Kingdom of Naples 1495: League of Venice; Papal States; Republic of Venice; Kingdom of Naples; Kingdoms of Spain; Duchy of Milan; Holy Roman Empire; Republic of Florence England (1496–98); Margraviate of Mantua; Republic of Genoa	Kingdom of France: (Old Swiss Confederacy) Swiss mercenaries; Duchy of Milan (before 1495); Duchy of Ferrara (officially neutral)	Victory	Maximilian I
Swabian War (1499)	Holy Roman Empire Swabian League	Old Swiss Confederacy Three Leagues of the Grisons	Swiss Victory Peace of Basel: Swiss Confederacy exempt from the resolutions of the Imperial Diet of Worms	Maximilian I
Italian War of 1521–1526	Holy Roman Empire; Spain; England; Papal States (1521–1523 and 1525–1526)	France: (Old Swiss Confederacy) Swiss mercenaries; Republic of Venice; Papal States (1524–1525); Marquisate of Saluzzo	Victory	Charles V
War of the League of Cognac (1526–1530)	Pro-Habsburg: Holy Roman Empire; Spain; Duchy of Ferrara; Republic of Genoa (1528–1530); Duchy of Mantua (1528–1530); Papal States (1530)	League of Cognac: Kingdom of France; (Old Swiss Confederacy) Swiss mercenaries; Papal States (1526–1529); (Papal States) Swiss Guards; Republic of Venice; Republic of Florence; Kingdom of England; Republic of Genoa (1526–1528); Kingdom of Navarre; Duchy of Milan	Victory	Charles V
Little War in Hungary (1526–1568)	Holy Roman Empire: Archduchy of Austria; Kingdom of Bohemia; Duchy of Styria; Duchy of Carniola; Royal Hungary; Kingdom of Croatia; Spain; Papal States	Ottoman Empire; John Szapolyai's Hungarian kingdom	Defeat	Charles V
Conquest of Tunis (1535)	(Spain) Spanish Empire: Kingdom of Naples; Kingdom of Sicily; Holy Roman Empire: Republic of Genoa; County of Flanders; Kingdom of Portugal; Papal States; Knights of Malta	Ottoman Empire; Kingdom of France	Habsburg and allied victory: Sack of Tunis; Muley Hassan of the Hafsid dynasty restored as client ruler of Tunis and Spanish-Imperial tributary.	Charles V
Italian War of 1536–1538	Holy Roman Empire; Spain	Kingdom of France; Ottoman Empire	Truce of Nice	Charles V
Italian War of 1542–1546	Holy Roman Empire; Saxony; Brandenburg; Spain (Kingdom of England) England	France; Ottoman Empire: Regency of Algiers; Jülich-Cleves-Berg; Denmark-Norway (1542–1543)	Inconclusive	Charles V
Schmalkaldic War 1546–1547	Holy Roman Empire: Habsburg Austria; Electorate of Saxony; (Bohemia) Bohemian Crown; Habsburg Spain; Habsburg Hungary Supported by: Papal States	Schmalkaldic League: Electorate of Saxony; Hesse; Electoral Palatinate; Bremen; Lübeck; Brunswick-Lüneburg; Württemberg; Pomerania-Wolgast; Anhalt-Köthen; Brandenburg-Küstrin; Lesser German states; Supported by: England	Victory: Capitulation of Wittenberg; Schmalkadic League dissolved; Saxon electoral dignity passed to the Albertine House of Wettin	Charles V
Second Schmalkaldic War March–August 1552	Imperial–Habsburg forces Holy Roman Empire: (Habsburg monarchy) Habsburg Austria	Protestant princes: Electoral Saxony; Hesse; Prussia; Brandenburg-Kulmbach; Supported by: France	Protestant victory: Peace of Passau (1552); Peace of Augsburg (1555); Three Bishoprics annexed by the Kingdom of France	Charles V
Long Turkish War (1593–1606)	Holy Roman Empire; Transylvania; Kingdom of Hungary; Papal States; Spain	Ottoman Empire	Inconclusive: Peace of Zsitvatorok	Rudolph II
War of the Jülich Succession (1609–1614)	1609–1610: Holy Roman Empire; Principality of Strasbourg; Prince-Bishopric of Liège; Catholic League	1609–1610: Margraviate of Brandenburg; Palatinate-Neuburg; United Provinces; Kingdom of France; Protestant Union	Treaty of Xanten	Rudolph II Matthias
War of the Montferrat Succession	Supporting the Duke of Mantua: Duchy of Mantua; Montferrat; Tuscany (1613) (Spain) Spanish Empire; France (1613–14); Holy Roman Empire; Kingdom of Naples; Genoa	Supporting the Duke of Savoy: Duchy of Savoy; Montferrat; Tuscany (1613); France (1615–17); Venice	Victory: Peace of Asti; Savoy renounces its claims to Montferrat	Matthias
Uskok War	Holy Roman Empire; Kingdom of Croatia; Spain	Republic of Venice; Dutch Republic; England	Treaty of Madrid (1617): Many Uskok pirates executed or exiled; Austrian garrison installed to check Uskoks.	Matthias
Thirty Years' War 1618–1648	Imperial alliance prior to 1635 (Note: States that allied at some point between 1618 and 1635): Habsburg Monarchy; (Spain) Spanish Empire; Bavaria; Catholic League; Post–1635 Peace of Prague: Holy Roman Empire; (Spain) Spanish Empire; Denmark–Norway	Anti-Imperial alliance prior to 1635 (Note: States that fought against the Emperor at some point between 1618 and 1635): Kingdom of Bohemia; Sweden; Palatinate; (Duchy of Savoy) Savoy; Transylvania; Dutch Republic; Denmark–Norway; Heilbronn League; Hesse-Kassel; Brandenburg-Prussia; Saxony; Post–1635 Peace of Prague: France; Sweden; Dutch Republic; Hesse-Kassel	Peace of Prague (1635); Peace of Westphalia (1648): Peace of Münster (January 1648) between Spain and the Dutch Republic; Treaty of Osnabrück (IPO; October 1648) between Sweden and the Holy Roman Empire; Treaty of Münster (October 1648) (IPM; October 1648) between France and the Holy Roman Empire; Consequences: France annexes Décapole, and Sundgau; Sweden gains Wismar, Wolin, Western Pomerania, and Bremen-Verden; Brandenburg-Prussia obtains Eastern Pomerania; Spain recognises sovereignty of the Dutch Republic; Old Swiss Confederacy gains independence from the Holy Roman Empire	Ferdinand III
Upper Austrian peasant war of 1626	Holy Roman Empire; Bavaria	Austrian Rebels	Victory	Adam Von Herberstorff
Austro-Turkish War (1663–1664)	League of the Rhine: Kingdom of France; Holy Roman Empire: Electorate of Saxony; Brandenburg-Prussia; Electorate of Bavaria; Baden-Baden; Swabia; Piedmont-Savoy; Kingdom of Hungary; Kingdom of Croatia; Polish–Lithuanian Commonwealth	Ottoman Empire	Peace of Vasvár	Leopold I
Franco-Dutch War (1672–1678)	Dutch Republic; Holy Roman Empire (from 1673); Spain (from 1673); Brandenburg-Prussia (from 1673); Lorraine (from 1673); Denmark–Norway (from 1674); England (1678)	France; England (1672–74); Münster (1672–1674); Cologne (1672–1674); (Sweden) Swedish Empire (from 1674)	Treaty of Nijmegen: Major French territorial gains; France occupies Lorraine, Freiburg and Kehl	Leopold I
War of the Reunions	(Spain) Spain; Co-belligerent: (Habsburg monarchy) Holy Roman Empire (Republic of Genoa) Genoa	(Kingdom of France) France	Defeat: Truce of Ratisbon	Leopold I
Great Turkish War (1683–1699)	Holy Roman Empire Polish–Lithuanian Commonwealth Tsardom of Russia Republic of Venice Spanish Empire	Ottoman Empire	Victory: Treaty of Karlowitz; The Habsburg monarchy wins lands in Hungary, the Principality of Transylvania and the Balkans.; Poland-Lithuania captures Podolia.; Russia captures the port of Azov.; Venice captures Morea and inner Dalmatia.	Leopold I
Nine Years War (1688–1697)	Holy Roman Empire Dutch Republic England Scotland Spanish Empire Duchy of Savoy Portuguese Empire Swedish Empire (until 1691)	France	Treaty of Ryswick	Leopold I
War of the Spanish Succession (1701–1714)	Holy Roman Empire Austrian Monarchy Dutch Republic Prussia England (until 1707) Great Britain (from 1707) Piedmont-Savoy Habsburg Spain Portugal	France Spanish monarchy Bavaria (until 1704) Cologne (until 1702) Mantua (until 1708)	Treaties of Utrecht (1713), Rastatt (1714) and Baden (1714): Philip is recognized as King of Spain, but once more renounces any claim to the throne of France; Austria gains the crowns of Naples and Sardinia as well as the duchy of Milan and the Spanish Netherlands; Savoy gains the crown of Sicily which is soon to be exchanged with Sardinia	Leopold I Joseph I Charles VI
Rákóczi's War of Independence	Holy Roman Empire: Austria; Prussia; Margraviate of Baden; Serbs from the Military Frontier; Transylvanian Saxons; Kingdom of Croatia; Royalists; (Denmark) Danish Auxiliary Corps; Foreign mercenaries: Swiss; Germans; Italians; Spaniards	Kuruc (Kingdom of Hungary); Principality of Transylvania; Kingdom of France; Minorities: Hungarian Slovenes; Slovaks; Rusyns; Zipser Saxons; Hungarian Germans; Croats from Hungary; Šokac and Bunjevac people; Romanians in Hungary; pro-Hungarian Serbs; Foreign mercenaries and volunteers: Poles; Wallachians; Crimean Tatars; Swedes; Ottoman Turks; Germans; Lithuanians; Moldavians; Bulgarians; Lipka Tatars; Ruthenians	Victory	Leopold I Joseph I Charles VI
War of the Polish Succession (1733–1735)	Holy Roman Empire: Habsburg monarchy; Saxony; Prussia; Russia Poland Loyal to Augustus III	France Spain Savoy-Sardinia Duchy of Parma Sweden Poland Loyal to Stanislaus I	Treaty of Vienna: Austria loses the crowns of Naples and Sicily to Charles of Parma; Duchy of Lorraine to Stanislaus; Duchy of Parma to Austria; Grand Duchy of Tuscany to Francis Stephen; Poland loses direct control over the Duchy of Courland and Semigallia	Charles VI
Liège Revolution (1789–1791)	Holy Roman Empire: Habsburg monarchy; Prince-Bishops of Liège	Liège Rebels Brabant Rebels Republic of Liège Supported by:Prussia	Foundation of Liège Republic (1789); reversion to Prince-Bishopric(1791); annexation by France (1795)	Leopold II
War of the First Coalition (mostly the Low Countries theatre) 1792–1797	First Coalition: Dutch Republic; Holy Roman Empire: Habsburg monarchy (Austria); Kingdom of Prussia; Electorate of Hanover; Hesse-Kassel (until 1795); Great Britain; Spanish Empire (1793–95): Kingdom of Naples (until 1796); Kingdom of Portugal; Kingdom of Prussia (until 1795); Kingdom of Sardinia (until 1796); Army of Condé	Kingdom of the French (1792); French First Republic (from 1792): Republic of Bouillon (1794–95); Batavian Republic (from 1795); Ligurian Republic (from 1795); Cisrhenian Republic (1797); Cisalpine Republic (1797); other sister republics; Spanish Empire (1796–97): Polish Legions (from 1797)	French Republican victory: French monarchy abolished, republicanism spread across Europe; All southern Low Countries and Left Bank of the Rhine annexed by France (1795); Treaty of The Hague (1795); Batavian Republic established as a French sister republic; Peace of Basel (1795); Prussia and Hesse-Kassel withdraw from Coalition; Spain allies with France (ending the War of the Pyrenees); Treaty of Campo Formio (1797); Habsburg monarchy accepts the loss of the Austrian Netherlands	Francis II
War of the Second Coalition 1798–1802	Second Coalition: Holy Roman Empire (until 1801); Habsburg monarchy (Austria, until 1801); Russian Empire (until 1798); Great Britain (until 1801); United Kingdom (from 1801); Kingdom of Portugal; Kingdom of Naples; Ottoman Empire; French royalists	French First Republic: Batavian Republic; Cisalpine Republic; Helvetic Republic; Ligurian Republic; Roman Republic (1798–99); Parthenopean Republic (1799); other sister republics; Spanish Empire	French victory: France briefly conquers the Papal States and captures Pope Pius VI (1798–99); Treaty of Lunéville (1801) recognises Holy Roman Empire's loss of southern Low Countries to France; Concordat of 1801: Pope Pius VII recognises the abolition of the Prince-Bishopric of Liège	Francis II
War of the Third Coalition 1803–1806 (part of the Napoleonic Wars)	Third Coalition: United Kingdom; Sweden (1804–06); Russian Empire (1805–06); Holy Roman Empire (1805); Austrian Empire (1805); Kingdom of Naples (1805–06); Kingdom of Sicily (1805–06)	First French Empire (Note: The French First Republic transformed into the First French Empire on 18 May 1804 with the adoption of the Constitution of the Year XII. The Coronation of Napoleon took place on 2 December 1804.): Batavian Republic; Etruria; (Kingdom of Italy (Napoleonic)) Italy; Spain; (Electorate of Bavaria) Bavaria; Württemberg	French victory: Treaty of Pressburg (1805): Austrian Empire leaves Coalition; Consolidation of the First French Empire; Dissolution of the Holy Roman Empire (Note: Holy Roman Emperor Francis II of Habsburg proclaimed the Austrian Empire on 11 August 1804, elevating the Habsburg monarchy to imperial status by himself. The indirect causes of this move are the French conquest of the Rhineland and further expansion into Germany and the Reichsdeputationshauptschluss of 1803, which curbed the meaning and power of the Holy Roman Empire/Emperor. The direct cause of Francis' proclamation was the adoption of the new French Constitution of 18 May 1804, which appointed Napoleon as Emperor of the French (followed by his coronation on 2 December 1804). Instead of an increasingly meaningless and non-hereditary title that was dependent on the cooperation of the Electors and was limited to only the northwestern parts of his Hausmacht, Francis now made all Austrian Habsburg possessions into a unified hereditary empire.); Creation of the Confederation of the Rhine; Formation of the Fourth Coalition a few months later	Francis II

== See also ==
- Reichskrieg
- Army of the Holy Roman Empire (Reichsarmee)
- Imperial Army of the Holy Roman Emperor (Kaiserliche Armee)
- Imperial Military Constitution
- Imperial Register
- Roman Month
- List of wars in the Low Countries until 1560
- List of wars in the southern Low Countries (1560–1829)
- List of wars involving Francia (5th century–987, including West, Middle and East Francia)
- List of wars involving Germany (1806–present)
- Wars and battles involving Prussia (1656–1947)

== Bibliography ==
- Croxton, Derek (2013). The Last Christian Peace: The Congress of Westphalia as A Baroque Event. Palgrave Macmillan. ISBN 978-1-137-33332-2.
- Heitz, Gerhard; Rischer, Henning (1995). Geschichte in Daten. Mecklenburg-Vorpommern; History in data; Mecklenburg-Western Pomerania (in German). Koehler&Amelang. ISBN 3-7338-0195-4.
- Wilson, Peter H. (23 July 1999). The Holy Roman Empire 1495-1806. Bloomsbury Publishing. ISBN 978-1-349-27649-3.
