= Reichskrieg =

War fought by the Holy Roman Empire

A Reichskrieg ("Imperial War", pl. Reichskriege) was a war fought by the Holy Roman Empire as a whole against a common enemy. After the Peace of Westphalia in 1648, a Reichskrieg was a formal state of war that could only be declared by the Imperial Diet.

There were two kinds of Reichskrieg with two different legal bases. The first was a Reichsexekutionskrieg, a military action of the empire against one of its own Imperial Estates (Reichstände). This could only be done after one of the empire's two supreme courts, the Imperial Chamber Court or the Imperial Aulic Council, had found the offending estate to be in breach of the peace, and the estate was too powerful to be subdued by the Imperial Circle to which it belonged. The second kind of Reichskrieg was that against another sovereign state that had violated the empire's rights or frontiers. After 1519, the emperors were bound to get the support of the Imperial Electors prior to declaring war on another state. From 1648, they required the approval of the diet for both kinds of war.

The only state against which a formal Reichskrieg was ever declared was France. The diet declared war on France in 1689, 1702, 1734, 1793 and 1799. The declaration created a state of war, but it was still necessary for the emperor by a series of orders to begin the decentralised process of forming the Reichsarmee (Army of the Holy Roman Empire) out of the Imperial Circles' troops. What each estate owed in both money and men was determined by the Imperial Military Constitution. Following the Reichsdeputationshauptschluss (1803), the six imperial cities that remained were pledged to perpetual neutrality even during a Reichskrieg.

Formal Reichskriege were not declared against the Ottoman Empire as this was not necessary in the period after 1648. A special collective defense and quota system (including both supplying troops and financial aid) for fighting the Turks from all the German states (both Catholic and Protestant) and a further extension of raising various Kreistruppen under Leopold I, was in place in the form of Türkenhilfe ("Turkish Aid"), the financial aspect helped by a specific tax, Reichstürkenhilfe from the onset of the Ottoman–Habsburg Wars.

== Middle Ages ==
In the Middle Ages, the formal mechanisms of imperial war did not yet exist. Historians still sometimes speak of imperial wars, such as the war against the Count of Württemberg in 1311–1312; that declared by the Emperor Sigismund against Duke Philip the Good of Burgundy in 1434; or that declared against the Armagnacs by the Emperor Frederick III in 1444.

== Imperial reforms, 1495–1519 ==
At the Diet of Worms in 1495, the emperor was prohibited from making war in the name of the empire without first consulting the Imperial Diet. His right to make war in his own name and with his own resources was not restricted. This was the first restriction on the emperor's war-making powers, and it introduced the concept of a war fought by the whole empire as distinct from a war fought privately by the emperor.

The 1495 diet also declared an Eternal Peace and instituted a supreme court, the Imperial Chamber Court. These acts outlawed private warfare and feuds, and created a binding judicial mechanism for dispute resolution. This had the effect of making civil wars a matter of breaching the imperial peace (Reichsfriedensbruch) to be resolved by the courts. It was illegal for any Imperial Estate to assist another that was breaching the peace. Following court rulings, the emperor could issue an "advocates' mandate" (mandatum advocatorium) that identified estates in breach of the peace as "enemies of the empire" (Reichsfeinde) and required other estates to act to bring the enemy to heel. Thus, after a judicial process, the empire could make war on one of its own members that was in breach of the peace.

Charles V in his Wahlkapitulation (electoral capitulation) of 1519 agreed not to declare war without the consent of the electors. This represented a loosening of the restriction imposed in 1495.

== Turkish wars (Türkenkriege), 1529–1791 ==
In the early modern period, a fundamental difference was introduced to the empire between wars against fellow Christians and wars against non-Christians, which, in the imperial context, meant the Ottoman Turks. Between 1529 and 1699, the empire was in a constant state of war with the Ottomans, punctuated only by temporary truces that usually involved the payment of tribute to the Ottomans. This permanent state of war followed from the Ottoman division of world between the lands of Islam and the "house of war". These wars attracted support from both Catholic and Protestant Europe. Although they had the support of the Papacy, they were never declared crusades.

Owing to the impossibility of peace, the right of the emperor to demand assistance in the war against the Ottomans was unquestioned. In the 1520s the Imperial Diet asserted its right to debate the level of the "Turkish aid" (Türkenhilfe), but not its requirement. Since the state of war did not require approval by the Imperial Diet, there was also no question of the emperor's right to demand assistance from those imperial states, like Bohemia and Italy, that did not participate in the diet. During the active phases of the long war, bells would be rung in churches throughout the empire at noon to remind subjects to pray for the success of the imperial armies, a practice known as the "Turkish bells" (Türkenglocken).

The Diet voted to raise troops from the Imperial states for the Turkish war five times before the Peace of Zsitvatorok ended the Long Turkish War in 1606. An army of the Empire was thus in the field, often outside of the empire's borders, in 1532, 1542, 1552, 1566–67 and 1593–1606. During the last war, the troops of the Empire also undertook garrison duty on the Croatian Military Frontier.

In 1544, the Diet of Speyer declared France to be an "enemy of the empire" (Reichsfeind) on account of its alliance with the Ottomans. This permitted the emperor to make war against France on behalf of the empire, but it was an unusual step and one not repeated for over a century.

A permanent peace was finally agreed in the Treaty of Karlowitz (1699), although there were subsequent wars against the Ottomans in 1716–18, 1736–39 and 1787–91. The Turkish bells were rung in 1716–18 and 1736–39, but the idea was rejected in 1787–91 as out of step with the Enlightenment.

== Evolution of the Reichskrieg, 1618–1688 ==
During the Thirty Years' War (1618–48), no Reichskrieg was ever declared. The emperor made war by means of advocates' mandates. Imperial estates signed treaties with the emperor and with each other to provide armies as required.

The Treaty of Osnabrück of 1648 restricted the right of the emperor to make war in the empire's name—either against external foes or internal violators of the peace—without permission from the Imperial Diet. The first war waged in the empire's name after 1648 was the war against the Ottomans in 1663–64.

It is commonly said that the Emperor Leopold I obtained a declaration of Reichskrieg (or Reichskriegserklärung) against France in 1674 during the Franco-Dutch War, In fact, Leopold had expelled the French ambassador to the Empire from Regensburg in March 1674 and informed the diet that he considered France an enemy of the Empire. Taking advantage of the general anti-French mood, he secured the diet's sanction of imperial aid to the Electoral Palatinate and other territories threatened by the French on 31 March. In April and May, the emperor issued further decrees implementing the diet's grant of aid. His decision not to call for a Reichskrieg forced him to lean heavily on the militarised princes and thus further increased their standing and influence in the Empire. Although the diet, at the suggestion of the French king, Louis XIV, considered sending its own representative to the peace conference at Nijmegen in 1675–76, this was vetoed by Leopold, who asserted that since it was not a Reichskrieg he retained full authority to negotiate on the empire's behalf. This set a precedent that was upheld even in future Reichskriege in 1697 and 1714: the emperor could negotiate peace without the diet. The negotiated treaty, however, had still to be ratified by the diet.

In 1681, the Imperial Diet approved a triple quota of Imperial Circle troops (Kreistruppen) for the relief of Vienna, but as it was a war against the Turks no declaration of Reichskrieg was necessary. In the same year, in response to military flaws exposed during the Dutch War, the diet passed a law on military organization that formed the basis of the Imperial Military Constitution until the end of the empire.

== Wars against France ==
=== 1689 ===
Between 1672 and 1688, the emperor employed advocates' mandates against Louis XIV of France. When in 1688 Louis invaded the Palatinate, the whole empire mobilized against him. Then, on 11 February 1689, the Imperial Diet approved a declaration of war against France. On 3 April 1689, Leopold I issued advocates' mandates putting the declaration into effect. This had the effect of converting the Kreistruppen into a true Reichsarmee, although the actual process by which this was done was highly decentralised and required the issuance of old-fashioned advocates' mandates. Despite this, the Empire did not join the Grand Alliance in May 1689, although the emperor did on his own behalf as ruler of Austria and Hungary.

The declaration of war of 1689 was revolutionary. The precedent of 1544 had not been forgotten, and the war with the Ottomans was raging in the east. The declaration of war on France sought to build morale and rally support by equating the Christian French to the Muslims Turks.

=== 1702 ===
On 30 September 1702, the Imperial Diet voted a triple quota (triplum or 120,000 men) for defence against France. In November, it formally declared war on France. Two of the electors—Joseph Clemens of Cologne and Maximilian Emanuel of Bavaria—sided openly with France and were thus in breach of imperial law. Already in November, the Reichshofrat heard the case against them and recommended that the other electors be consulted about outlawing the rebels.

In 1705, the Emperor Joseph I pressured the diet to extend the Reichskrieg to include the wars ongoing in Italy and Hungary, but the diet refused. In November 1705, the electors minus Cologne and Bavaria voted to outlaw those two and the emperor transmitted the declaration of the imperial ban to the diet.

=== 1734 ===
During the War of the Polish Succession, which began in 1733, most of the empire supported the claim of the Saxon elector, Augustus III, to the Polish throne, against the claims of Stanisław Leszczyński, who was supported by the French. War between France and Austria broke out in the Rhineland and in Italy. On 9 November 1733, the Frankfurt Association, an association of Imperial Circles, authorised the mobilization of a triple quota for the Austrian war effort.

Finally, on 9 April 1734, the Imperial Diet declared war against France. Ultimately, while 36,338 troops were raised for the Reichsarmee by September 1735, various states provided 54,302 troops to the Austrian army through simple bilateral agreements alone. In 1735, Russia intervened on the side of the empire. A preliminary peace was signed in Vienna on 3 October that year, but the final peace treaty was not signed until 1738.

=== 1793 ===
After the outbreak of the French Revolutionary War, Emperor Francis II petitioned the Imperial Diet for 100 Roman months on 1 September 1792. In November, the Imperial Diet agreed to a triple quota and thirty Roman months (that is, four million florins) to be paid into the Imperial Operations Fund. Finally, on 23 March 1793, the Imperial Diet declared an imperial war against revolutionary France. Under Austrian and Prussian pressure, the stated goal of this Reichskrieg was to secure from France compensation for those imperial estates, such as Austria and Prussia, that had been fighting since April 1792. The implication was that such compensation would come in the form of territorial cessions. The Reichskrieg of 1793, unlike all those before, was thus an offensive war, although the diet itself refused to recognised this, preferring to see it as a war forced upon it by France.

Throughout 1793, as Prussia's commitment to the war weakened, the increasingly defensive Reichskrieg rose in popularity. In January 1794, with the war going badly for the Empire, discussions were held behind the scenes to try to strengthen the emperor's war-making powers, but no agreement could be reached and in the end no proposal was tabled in the Imperial Diet.

=== 1799 ===
In late February 1799, Austria having failed to satisfy a French ultimatum, France resumed the war with the Empire by invading the Rhineland while the Congress of Rastatt was still sitting and before a peace treaty had been signed. The emperor decreed that the Reichskrieg was resumed. On 16 September, the Diet voted 100 Roman months and a quintuple quota (quintuplum), the largest military outlay in the history of the empire. This was little more than a paper decision, since many states had declared neutrality and voted against the resumption of the Reichskrieg. Since no peace treaty had been signed, it had also been unnecessary to vote on a formal declaration of war, the emperor's declaration on resuming hostilities was sufficient.

== Reichsexekutionskriege ==
=== Against Sweden (1675) ===
In response to the Swedish invasion of Brandenburg in support of France in 1674, a Reichsexekution was launched against Sweden, whose king owned the imperial duchies of Bremen and Verden, on 17 July 1675. The historian Peter Wilson denies that the war against Sweden qualifies as a true Reichskrieg for the same reasons the contemporaneous war against France does not. Writing in the 18th century, however, the constitutional scholar Johann Jakob Moser regarded it as a Reichskrieg.

=== Against Prussia (1757) ===
During the First Silesian War (1740–42), the Emperor Charles VII sought a declaration of Reichskrieg against Austria, although the latter had not breached imperial law and there was therefore no justification. The pro-Austrian elector of Mainz, Johann Friedrich Karl von Ostein, tabled a formal protest in the Imperial Diet on 23 September 1743 alleging that the election of Charles VII had been irregular. In such a situation, there was no chance of the diet agreeing to the emperor's proposal for a Reichskrieg against Austria. The Second Silesian War (1744–45) thus also went by without any imperial action. The Third Silesian War (1756–63), however, became wrapped in a global war of great power politics, the Seven Years' War, and Prussia could not avoid an imperial response.

On 13 September 1756, the Emperor Francis I issued an advocate's mandate (mandata avocatoria) releasing imperial subjects from their oaths to the King in Prussia, Frederick II, and ordering them not to assist him in his illegal war. On 14 September, Francis requested the Imperial Diet sanction a Reichsexekution to restore peace to the empire. This was debated on 20 September without resolution. On 9 October, Francis increased his demands, asking for the Reichsarmee to be mobilised and for the intervention of the two guarantors of the Peace of Westphalia (France and Sweden).

On 17 January 1757, a Reichskrieg was declared against Prussia. A triple quota was called up for a Reichs-Exekutions-Armee. The representatives of the Prussian king were removed from imperial institutions, imperial postal service to Prussian territory was suspended and travel into and out of it was banned, although not trade (even in war materiel, which was only classed as contraband in 1760).

In February 1763, the Imperial Diet formally declared the Reichskrieg over and the Treaty of Hubertusburg restored the status quo ante bellum.

The War of the Bavarian Succession that broke out between Austria and Prussia in 1778 saw barely any fighting, and was diplomatically resolved before any Reichsexekution was sought by the emperor.

== Legacy ==
After the demise of the Holy Roman Empire in 1806 and the formation of German Confederation (Deutscher Bund) in 1815, a war involving several German states or countries against other parties were referred to as a Bundesfeldzug, that is, a "federal campaign". Examples include the First Schleswig War (1848–51) and the Austro-Prussian War (1866).

== Sources ==
- Blockmans, Wim; Prevenier, Walter (1999). The Promised Lands: The Low Countries under Burgundian Rule, 1369–1530. Philadelphia: University of Pennsylvania Press.
- Düwel, Sven (2016). Ad bellum Sacri Romano-Germanici Imperii solenne decernendum: Die Reichskriegserklärung gegen Brandenburg-Preußen im Jahr 1757: Das Verfahren der "preußischen Befehdungssache" 1756/57 zwischen Immerwährendem Reichstag und Wiener Reichsbehörden. Berlin: Lit Verlag Dr. Wilhelm Hopf.
- Düwel, Sven (2017). "Le dichiarazioni di guerra imperiali dal 1674 al 1757". Goethe University Frankfurt.
- Gagliardo, John (1980). Reich and Nation: The Holy Roman Empire as Idea and Reality, 1763–1806. Bloomington: Indiana University Press.
- Haering, Hermann (1910). Der Reichskrieg gegen Graf Eberhard den Erlauchten von Württemberg und seine Stellung in der allgemeinen deutschen Geschichte. Stuttgart.
- Hardy, Duncan (2012). "The 1444–5 Expedition of the Dauphin Louis to the Upper Rhine in Geopolitical Perspective". Journal of Medieval History. 38 (3): 358–87. doi:10.1080/03044181.2012.697051. S2CID 154109619.
- Hochedlinger, Michael (2013). Austria's Wars of Emergence: War, State and Society in the Habsburg Monarchy, 1683–1797. London and New York: Routledge.
- Hughes, Michael (1992). Early Modern Germany, 1477–1806. Philadelphia: University of Pennsylvania Press.
- Whaley, Joachim (2012). Germany and the Holy Roman Empire, Volume II: The Peace of Westphalia to the Dissolution of the Reich, 1648–1806. Oxford: Oxford University Press.
- Wilson, Peter (1998). German Armies: War and German Society, 1648–1806. London: UCL Press.
- Wilson, Peter (2016). Heart of Europe: A History of the Holy Roman Empire. Cambridge, MA: Belknap Press.
