= Austro-Turkish War =

The term Austro-Turkish War may refer to:

- Austro-Turkish War (1593–1606)
- Austro-Turkish War (1663–1664)
- Austro-Turkish War (1683–1699)
- Austro-Turkish War (1716–1718)
- Austro-Turkish War (1737–1739)
- Austro-Turkish War (1788–1791)
- Austro-Hungarian campaign in Bosnia and Herzegovina in 1878

== See also ==
- Description of the armed forces of the opposing sides:
  - Army of the Holy Roman Empire
  - Imperial Army of the Holy Roman Emperor
  - Austro-Hungarian Army
  - Military of the Ottoman Empire
- Ottoman wars in Europe
- Ottoman–Habsburg wars in Hungary (1526–1568)
- Habsburg-Ottoman War (disambiguation)
- Great War (disambiguation)
