= Imperial Military Constitution =

Military Constitution in the Holy Roman Empire

The Imperial Military Constitution (German: Reichsheeresverfassung, also called the Reichskriegsverfassung) was the collection of military laws of the Holy Roman Empire. Like the rest of the imperial constitution, it grew out of various laws and governed the establishment of military forces within the Empire. It was the basis for the establishment of the Army of the Holy Roman Empire (Reichsarmee, created in 1422), which was under the supreme command of the Emperor but was distinct from his Imperial Army (Kaiserliche Armee, emerged in the 17th century), as it could only be deployed by the Imperial Diet. The last Imperial Defence Order (Reichsdefensionalordnung), entitled Reichsgutachten in puncto securitatis, of 13/23 May 1681, completed the military constitution of the Holy Roman Empire.

== Legal development ==
=== First Imperial Register ===
The first Imperial Register was drawn up at the Imperial Diet at Nuremberg in 1422. The proposal of the princes to levy a "hundredth" penny and use it to enlist and maintain an army of soldiers for the duration of a war was opposed by the cities. It was agreed to set up a single register as a list of the troop contingents of the individual imperial estates.

== See also ==
- Circle troops
- Circle Colonel
- Roman Month
- Army of the Holy Roman Empire

== Sources ==
- Der Augsburger Reichsabschied ("Augsburger Religionsfrieden") – full text

== Literature ==
- Heinz Angermeier (1965), "Die Reichskriegsverfassung in der Politik der Jahre 1679–1681 : Germanistische Abteilung", Zeitschrift der Savigny-Stiftung für Rechtsgeschichte (in German), vol. 82, Wien, pp. 190–222
- Winfried Dotzauer (1998), Die deutschen Reichskreise. (1383–1806). Geschichte und Aktenedition, Stuttgart: Franz Steiner Verlag, ISBN 3-515-07146-6
- Richard Fester (1886), Die armierten Stände und die Reichskriegsverfassung. (1681–1697) (in German), Frankfurt am Main: Carl Jügel's Verlag
- Hanns Hubert Hofmann, ed. (1976), Quellen zum Verfassungsorganismus des Heiligen Römischen Reiches Deutscher Nation 1495–1815, Darmstadt: Wissenschaftliche Buchgesellschaft, ISBN 3-534-01959-8. (Ausgewählte Quellen zur deutschen Geschichte der Neuzeit. Vol. 13)
- Gerhard Papke (1983), "Von der Miliz zum Stehenden Heer. Wehrwesen im Absolutismus", in Militärgeschichtliches Forschungsamt (ed.), Deutsche Militärgeschichte in sechs Bänden 1648–1939 (in German), vol. 1, Section I, Herrsching: Manfred Pawlak Verlagsgesellschaft, ISBN 3-88199-112-3
- Martin Rink; Harald Potempa (2006), "Zweierlei Untergang: Der Zusammenbruch des Alten Reichs (962–1806) und des alten Preußen im Jahre 1806", Militärgeschichte, vol. 3, pp. 4–9, ISSN 0940-4163
- Hanns Weigel (1912), Die Kriegsverfassung des alten deutschen Reiches von der Wormser Matrikel bis zur Auflösung (in German), Bamberg (Inaugural-Dissertation der juristischen Fakultät der Friedrich-Alexander-Universität zu Erlangen, 1911)
- Jürg Zimmermann (1983), "Militärverwaltung und Heeresaufbringung in Österreich bis 1806", in Militärgeschichtliches Forschungsamt (ed.), Deutsche Militärgeschichte in sechs Bänden 1648–1939 (in German), vol. 1, Section III, Herrsching: Manfred Pawlak Verlagsgesellschaft, ISBN 3-88199-112-3
- Stollberg-Rilinger, Barbara (2018). The Holy Roman Empire: A Short History. Princeton University Press. [Originally published as Das Heilige Römische Reich Deutscher Nation: Vom Ende des Mittelalters bis 1806 (Munich: C. H. Beck, 2013).]
