= Northern War (disambiguation) =

The Great Northern War was a 1700–1721 conflict primarily between Sweden and Russia. Northern War, Northern Wars, or War in the North can also refer to:

- Any one of the Northern Wars, a loosely defined series of conflicts which concluded with the 1700–1721 war
- The Flagstaff War in Northern New Zealand, 1845-1846
- The War in the North, a campaign of the Spanish Civil War in 1937
- The Lord of the Rings: War in the North, 2011 fantasy video game

== See also ==
- Great War (disambiguation)
