= Habsburg–Ottoman War =

The term Habsburg–Ottoman War or Ottoman–Habsburg War may refer to:

- Habsburg–Ottoman wars in Hungary (1526–1568)
- Habsburg–Ottoman war of 1529–1533
- Habsburg–Ottoman war of 1540–1547
- Habsburg–Ottoman war of 1551–1562
- Habsburg–Ottoman war of 1565–1568
- Habsburg–Ottoman war of 1593–1606, a.k.a. the Long Turkish War)
- Habsburg–Ottoman war of 1663–1664, a.k.a. the Austro-Turkish War (1663–1664)
- Habsburg–Ottoman war of 1683–1699, a.k.a. the Great Turkish War
- Habsburg–Ottoman war of 1716–1718, a.k.a. the Austro-Turkish War (1716–1718)
- Habsburg–Ottoman war of 1737–1739, a.k.a. the Russo-Turkish War (1735–1739)
- Habsburg–Ottoman war of 1788–1791, a.k.a. the Austro-Turkish War (1788–1791)

== See also ==
- Austro-Turkish War (disambiguation)
- Great War (disambiguation)
