= Italienzug =

Holy Roman Emperor's coronation journey to Rome

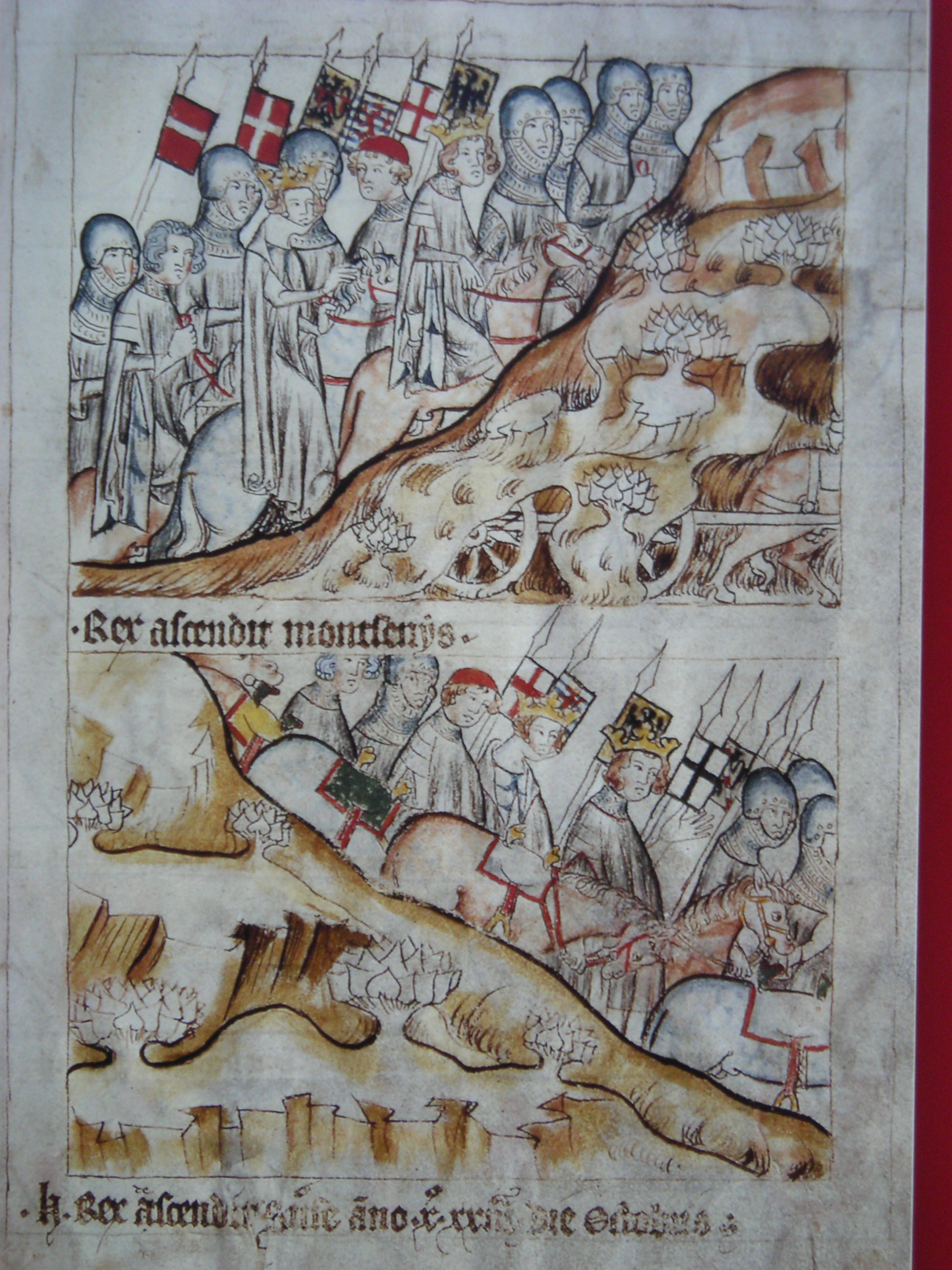
Henry VII crossing the Alps on his Italienzug (1312). From the Codex Balduini Trevirensis (c.1340).

An Italienzug (also known as Romfahrt or Romzug in German, or as expeditio italica in Latin) was the expedition undertaken by an elected king of the Romans to be crowned by the pope as Holy Roman Emperor in the city of Rome. Prior to the reforms of Frederick Barbarossa, the kings of the Romans struggled to muster an army for the expedition, for they needed the formal approval of the Reichstag. If such approval was granted, the king had permission to recruit knights for their military service in Italy for 410 days.

However, the nobility was generally uninterested in supplying such an army with troops and inclined to rather substitute a monetary payment for the service. Therefore, the small force tended to be composed of mercenaries and high ranking clergymen, reinforced by loyal Italian cities. Occasionally, the substitution was not enough – Henry V ended up using his wife Matilda of England's dowry to fund his Italienzug.

Following Barbarossa's struggles against the Lombard League towards the end of the 12th century, the system was reformed by banning monetary substitution and requiring each prince to contribute a fixed number of troops to the cause. These troops could be substituted by an amount of money, which was eventually known as the Roman Month.

== Expeditions ==
- The 961–2 Italienzug – Otto I
- The 1046 Italienzug – Henry III
- The 1090 Italienzug – Henry IV
- The 1154–55 Italienzug – Frederick I
- The 1310–13 Italienzug – Henry VII
- The 1327–29 Italienzug – Louis IV
- The 1433 Italienzug – Sigismund
- The 1451–52 Italienzug – Frederick III
- The 1508 Italienzug – Maximilian I, incomplete, blocked by Venetians
- The 1529 Italienzug – Charles V, expedition to Bologna, final Italienzug
