= Circle Colonel =

The Circle Colonel (German: Kreisobrist) was an office in the Imperial Circles of the Holy Roman Empire of the German Nation in the Early Modern Period.

According to the Circle Edict of 1522, every Circle had to nominate a Captain (Hauptmann) and notify the Emperor. He was not, however, primarily the military superior of the circle troops, but was to carry out all the tasks laid down in the Circle Edict. In the Augsburg reforms of 25 September 1555, his duties were set forth again, this time under the title of Circle Colonel.

== Duties ==
The most important duties of the circle colonels were:

- the responsibility for law and order (the Landfrieden) within the Circle,
- ensuring the Religious Peace,
- enforcing imperial legal rulings,
- administrative tasks concerning imperial currency and imperial policing,
- legal enforcement (execution) against defaulters within the Circle,
- taking charge of Circle business as tasked by the Circle between Circle councils,
- the mustering of circle troops and the supervision of their equipment and supplies.

Where a Circle Captain or Circle Colonel was actually nominated in the Imperial Circles, the office was usually transferred to the most senior (i.e. highest ranking) secular Imperial Estate in the Circle for them to fill.

== See also ==
- Holy Roman Empire
- Imperial Circle
- Bavarian Circle
- Franconian Circle
- Upper Rhenish Circle
- Swabian Circle
- Reichsarmee

== Literature ==
- Winfried Dotzauer: Die deutschen Reichskreise (1383–1806). Geschichte und Aktenedition. Franz Steiner Verlag, Stuttgart, 1998, ISBN 3-515-07146-6.
- Hans Hubert Hofmann (ed.): Quellen zum Verfassungsorganismus des Heiligen Römischen Reiches Deutscher Nation 1495–1815 (= Ausgewählte Quellen zur deutschen Geschichte der Neuzeit. Vol. 13). Wissenschaftliche Buchgesellschaft, Darmstadt, 1976, ISBN 3-534-01959-8.
