= Circle troops =

Military forces in the Holy Roman Empire

Circle troops (German: Kreistruppen) were the contingents of soldiers that the Imperial Circles (Reichskreise) actually placed at the disposal of the Army of the Holy Roman Empire or Reichsarmee. Following the Imperial Defence Order (Reichsdefensionalordnung), all imperial circles in the empire were obliged to provide contingents of troops, although not all did so in the event. The Imperial Register (Reichsmatrikel) laid down how many troops the individual Imperial States had to make available to the Reichsarmee.

== Emergence and structure ==
The Imperial Circles only emerged at the beginning of the 16th century. The first six were established at the Diet of Augsburg in 1500. They were only identified by numbers and consisted of imperial estates of all groups with the exception of the electors. With the creation of four other Imperial Circles in 1512, the Austrian Hereditary Lands and the electorates now joined the Imperial Circle structure.

The "most recent register of all time", drawn up at the Diet of Worms, contained the basic imperial direction, the Simplum. The further division of responsibility to individual Imperial Estates within each Circle was now the business of the Circles themselves according to the Worms register.

In a few Circles, the office of Circle Captain / Circle Colonel (Kreisobrist) was created: a military leader appointed for the long term. In some Circles the office of Circle General was created. He was appointed by the Circle for the management of its troops, and he and his staff, as well as the regimental commanders, were paid from the Circle's budget. The appointment and payment of the remaining officers was sometimes carried out by the Circles and sometimes by the Imperial Estates providing the contingents of troops.

== See also ==
- Imperial Army of the Holy Roman Emperor
- Imperial Register

== Literature ==
- Hanns Hubert Hofmann: Quellen zum Verfassungsorganismus des Heiligen Römischen Reiches Deutscher Nation 1495-1815, Wissenschaftliche Buchgesellschaft Darmstadt, 1st edn., 1976
- Winfried Dotzauer: Die deutschen Reichskreise (1383-1806), Franz Steiner Verlag, Stuttgart, 1998, ISBN 3-515-07146-6
