= Guerra Grande =

Guerra Grande can refer to:

- Uruguayan Civil War from 1839 to 1851
- Paraguayan War from 1864 to 1870
- Ten Years' War in Cuba, from 1868 to 1878
