= Décapole =

1354 to 1679 union of towns in Alsace

Colmar	Haguenau	Kaysersberg	Mulhouse	Munster
Obernai	Rosheim	Sélestat	Turckheim	Wissembourg

The Décapole (French pronunciation: [dekapɔl]; German: Zehnstädtebund [ˈtseːnʃtɛːtəˌbʊnt], Dekapolis or Dekapole) was an alliance formed in 1354 by ten Imperial cities of the Holy Roman Empire in the Alsace region to maintain their rights. It was disbanded in 1679.

In 1354 Emperor Charles IV of Luxembourg ratified the treaty uniting the towns of Haguenau, Colmar, Wissembourg, Turckheim, Obernai, Kaysersberg, Rosheim, Munster, Sélestat and Mulhouse. Haguenau became its capital while the Imperial City of Strasbourg, despite being the venue of its diets, remained outside the alliance. The town of Seltz joined the alliance when it received Imperial immediacy in 1357, but had to leave it after its mediatization to the Electorate of the Palatinate in 1414.

The affiliation was first discontinued after Charles' death in 1378; it was, however, re-established in the next year. The ten cities joined the Upper Rhenish Circle in 1500. In 1515, Mulhouse pulled out of the alliance in order to associate with the Old Swiss Confederacy. It was replaced in 1521 by the city of Landau in northern Alsace.

The alliance was strongly shaken by the Thirty Years' War which ravaged the region, allowing Louis XIV of France to annex southern Alsace according to the 1648 Peace of Westphalia. The signing of the Treaties of Nijmegen in 1679 finally brought an end to the Décapole. Mulhouse remained an independent city and exclave of the Swiss Confederacy until in 1798 it was annexed to the French First Republic. Landau together with the Palatinate was given to Bavaria after the 1815 Congress of Vienna.

== See also ==
- League of cities
