= Great War (disambiguation) =

The Great War is a title that refers to World War I.

It may also refer to:

== Historical conflicts ==
The following terms are all translated from the original language:

- "The Great French War", a term sometimes used to collectively refer to the French Revolutionary Wars (1792–1802) and the Napoleonic Wars (1803–15)
- The Great Patriotic War, is the Russian name for the Eastern Front of World War II
- "The Great War", English translation of Guerra Grande, Paraguayan name for the Paraguayan War
- "The Great War", Uruguayan name for the Uruguayan Civil War
- "The Great War", Polish and Belarusian name for the Polish–Lithuanian–Teutonic War
- The Ten Years' War between Spain and Cuba
- The Great Turkish War, also known as "The War of the Holy League"
- The Great Northern War, between Russian and Sweden, with assorted other powers on each side
- The Great Roman Civil War is a name for Caesar's civil war

== Film and television ==
- The Great War (1959 film), a 1959 Italian film starring Zachary Kiiza and Gideon Nkunda
- The Great War (2007 film), a 2007 CBC television documentary
- The Great War (2017 film), a 2017 American documentary film
- The Great War (2019 film), a 2019 American film
- The Great War (TV series), a 1964 BBC documentary series
- The Great War (YouTube channel), a YouTube channel dedicated to covering the events of World War I and its aftermath reported on the war on a weekly basis at a 100 year delay
- The Great War and the Shaping of the 20th Century, a 4-part 1996 PBS documentary series about World War I

== Other ==
- The Great War in England in 1897, an 1894 novel
- The Great War (novel series), an alternate history trilogy by Harry Turtledove
- The Great War (Sabaton album), 2019
- The Great War (Justin Currie album), 2010
- The Great War: Western Front, a 2023 video game
- "The Great War", a song on the extended version of Taylor Swift's album Midnights, 2022
- Great War Island, a river island in Serbia, located at the mouth of the Sava River
- The Great War, a fictional conflict in the video game franchise Fallout

== See also ==
- The First World War (disambiguation)
- Guerra Grande (disambiguation)
