= Roman Month =

Unit of taxation in the Holy Roman Empire

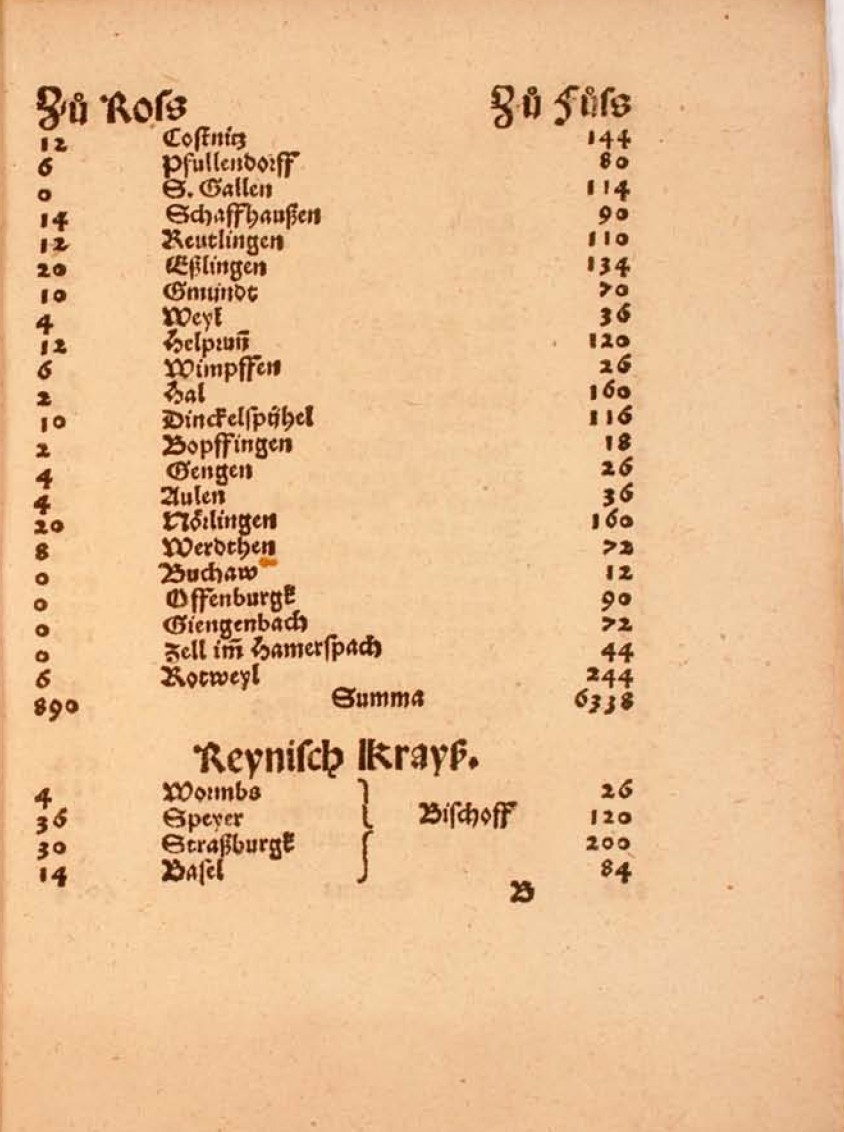
Partial list of the Free Imperial Cities of Swabia based on the Reichsmatrikel of 1521

The Roman Month (German Römer Monat, pl. Römer Monate, abbr. RM) was a basic unit of imperial taxation in the Holy Roman Empire, initially worth around 128,000 Rhenish guilders when the underlying tax was created in 1521 by the Emperor Charles V, equivalent to a month's wages for around 4,202 cavalry and 20,063 infantrymen. It gained this title due to its initial purpose of providing for one month's escort for the King of the Romans' trip to Rome to be crowned Holy Roman Emperor by the Pope (the Italienzug), though it was rarely, if ever, used for this purpose.

The tax was collected through a system that reflected the divided, corporate nature of the Holy Roman Empire. Though the local territorial powers recognized the need for a common purse to protect and preserve the Empire, they were simultaneously unwilling to surrender power to the Emperor. Thus, instead of a direct tax collected by the Emperor, obligations were set through the Worms Reichsmatrikel on the individual Electors, Bishops, Princes, Prelates, Counts, Lords, Imperial Towns, and other political structures to provide a set number of horse and footmen, or a set amount of money based on the wages of the requested troops. The obligations of the territorial powers were based on a rough estimate of how wealthy each individual territory in the Empire was, with some of the larger, richer territories obligated to provide hundreds of men, while the smaller lords provided as few as five. Through this system, almost 400 separate territories were obligated to pay something to the Empire, while leaving collection and payment of the tax up to the regional territorial powers, preserving local independence.

This obligation could be multiplied when more funds were required, allowing the Emperor some flexibility in taxing his subjects while keeping the distribution somewhat equal among the various territories of the Holy Roman Empire. Sometimes, the multiple requested could be very high, such as in the Peace of Prague, where Emperor Ferdinand II requested 120 months, to help pay for the ongoing Thirty Years' War.

== See also ==
- Coronation of the Holy Roman Emperor
- Imperial Military Constitution
- Italienzug
