= Imperial Register =

Holy Roman Empire conscription list

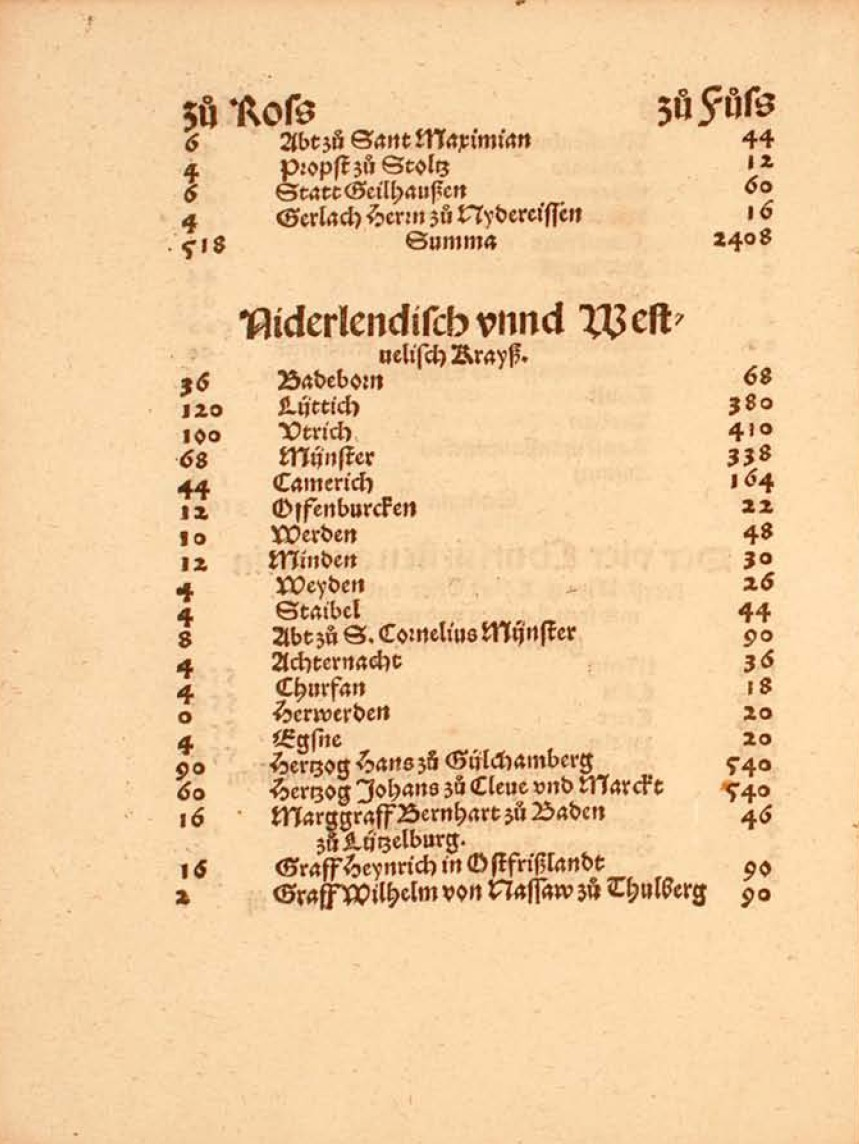
Page from a copy of the Imperial Register of 1532, stipulating the number of troops on horseback (zu Ross) and on foot (zu Fuss) states in the 'Netherlandish-Westphalian Circle' had to provide.

The Imperial Register (German: Reichsmatrikel, Dutch: rijksmatrikel) was a list of the Imperial Estates of the Holy Roman Empire that specified the precise numbers of troops they had to supply to the Army of the Holy Roman Empire and/or the financial support they had to make available to sustain the Army. An entry in the register was often viewed as an important indicator of the imperial immediacy of an imperial estate, although that was not always undisputed. The importance of the register for historical research lies in the fact that all Estates were recorded in it. However, it also contains obvious errors.

The term Matrikel is derived from the Latin word mātrīcula, a diminutive of mātrīx ("list", "register").

== See also ==
- Imperial Military Constitution

== Literature ==
- "Entry". Zedlers Universallexikon. Vol. 31. p. Reichs-Matrickel.
