= Army of the Holy Roman Empire =

Armed forces of the Holy Roman Empire

- Latin: Exercitus Imperii
- Active: 1422–1806
- Country: Holy Roman Empire
- Branch: Army
- Headquarters: Vienna
- Engagements: Burgundian Wars; Ottoman–Habsburg wars; Franco-Dutch War; Nine Years' War; War of the Spanish Succession; War of the Polish Succession; Seven Years' War; French Revolutionary and Napoleonic Wars

Commanders
- Notable commanders: See list: Nicholas, Count of Salm; Charles V; Leopold Wilhelm of Baden-Baden; Frederick VI, Margrave of Baden-Durlach; Charles V, Duke of Lorraine; Louis William of Baden-Baden; Eugene of Savoy; Guido Starhemberg; Dominik von Königsegg-Rothenfels; Leopold I, Prince of Anhalt-Dessau; Ernst Gideon von Laudon; Leopold Joseph von Daun; Maximilian Ulysses Browne; Frederick Michael, Count Palatine of Zweibrücken; Prince Josias of Saxe-Coburg-Saalfeld; Rudolf Ritter von Otto; Franz Wenzel, Graf von Kaunitz-Rietberg; Joseph Alvinczi von Borberek; Peter Vitus von Quosdanovich; Archduke Charles

The Army of the Holy Roman Empire (German: Reichsarmee, Reichsheer, or Reichsarmatur; Latin: Exercitus Imperii) was created in 1422 and came to an end when the Holy Roman Empire was dissolved in 1806 as a result of the Napoleonic Wars.

The Army of the Empire was not a standing army. When there was danger, it was mustered from among the elements constituting it, in order to conduct a military campaign or Reichsheerfahrt during an Imperial War (Reichskrieg) or an Imperial Execution (Reichsexekution). It could only be deployed with the consent of the Imperial Diet and should not be confused with the Imperial Army (Kaiserliche Armee) of the Holy Roman Emperor.

The Reichsarmee formally only refers to troops gathered by the circle system and is thus synonymous with the Kreistruppen (circle troops). It is not to be confused with the Imperial Army of the Holy Roman Emperor, which were troops mustered by the imperial family mostly from their direct estates for use at their own discretion. It is also not to be confused with armies of individual imperial states, even if troops from those states may also be serving in the Reichsarmee. For example in 1695 the electorates of Brandenburg, Bavaria, Saxony, and the Palatinate all maintained independent armies of 10,000 to 20,000 troops while also contributing forces to the Reichsarmee. Troops of the Reichsarmee only accounted for 41,300 out of more than 280,000 soldiers of the Holy Roman Empire in the field at that time.

== History ==
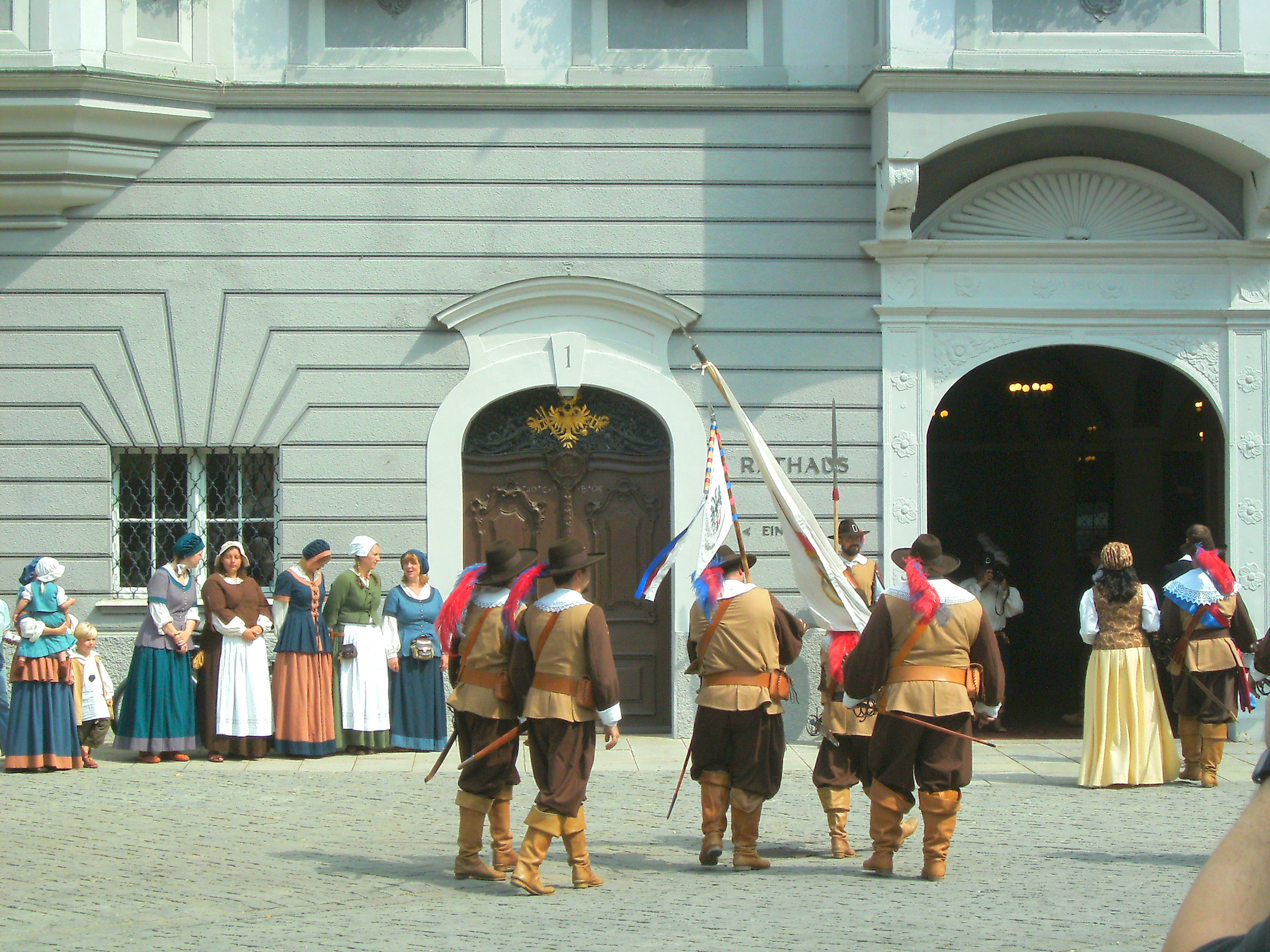
A unit of the army at Memmingen, Bavaria (re-enactment)

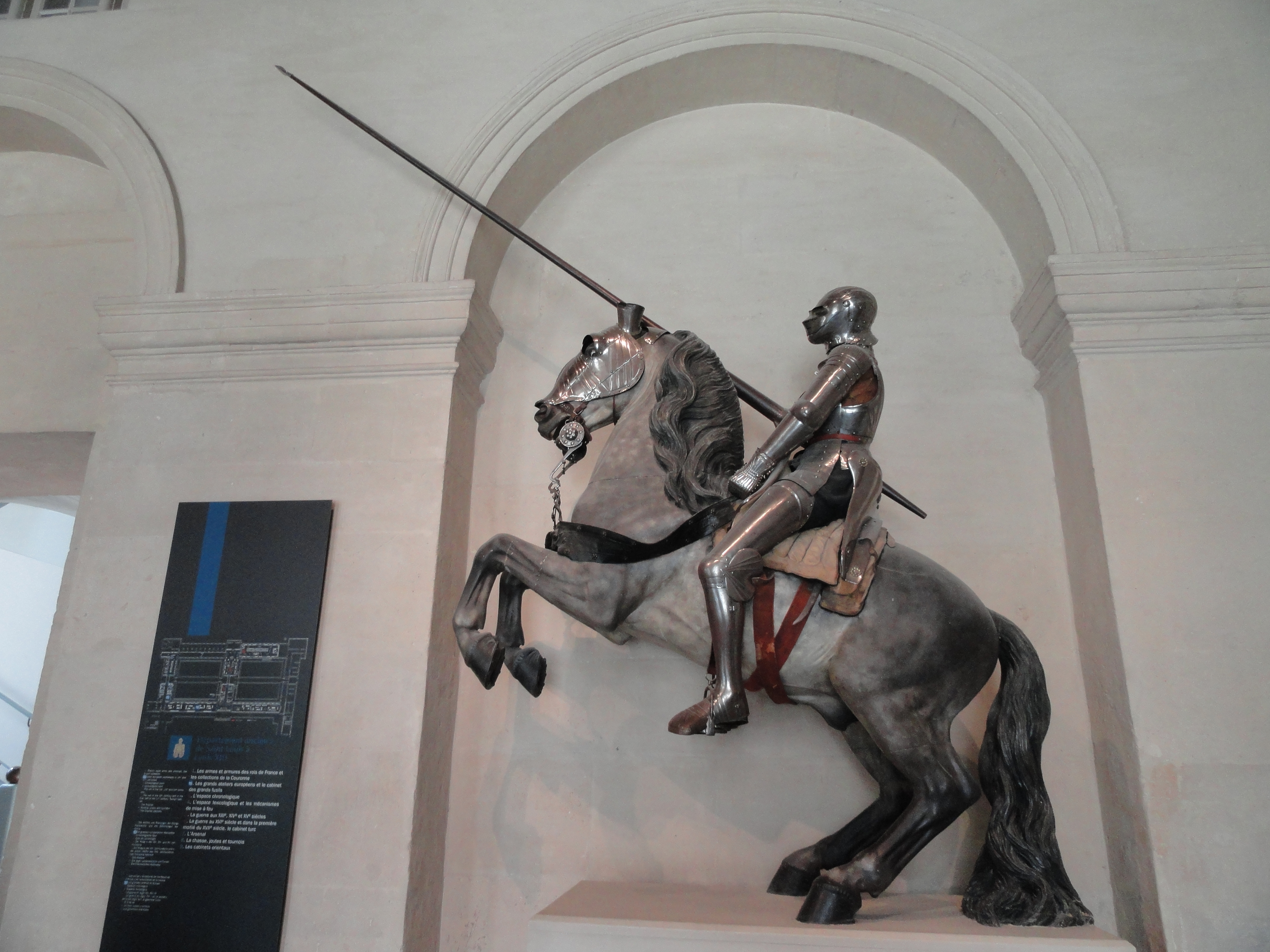
Maximilian Armour used by the Holy Roman Empire's army

Prompted by the threat posed by the Hussites, the Imperial Diet of 1422 held in Nuremberg created the Army of the Empire by demanding specific contingents of troops from the various parts of the Empire. The Hussite Wars continued from 1420 to 1434, by which point the army had proved its worth. Over the next hundred years, the size of the Army was controlled either by the number of serving men being strictly regulated or by limits on the money that paid for it. At the Diet of Worms in 1521 a commitment was made to keep the strength at 20,063 infantry and 4,202 cavalry. This was later simplified to 20,000 and 4,000. The monthly cost of paying for an army of this size was known as the Roman Month (Römermonat). The Imperial Register (Reichsmatrikel or Heeresmatrikel) determined the contributions of the individual states making up the Empire, the first being the Register of 1422.

Contrary to popular belief, the Army of the Empire did not take part in the Thirty Years' War of 1618 to 1648. The Emperor participated in this war with the Imperial Army (Kaiserliche Armee) instead.

The Constitution of the Army of the Empire (Reichsdefensionalordnung) of 1681 finally determined the composition of the army, fixing the contingents to be provided by the various Imperial Circles. The simple total strength (called in Latin the Simplum) was now fixed at 40,000 men, consisting of 28,000 infantry and 12,000 cavalry, including 2,000 dragoons (that is, mounted infantry). In emergencies, the size of the army could be increased by doubling or tripling the contingents. Such multiples were called in Latin the duplum and the triplum.

Nominal composition of the Army of the Empire in 1681
Imperial Circle	Cavalry	Infantry
Austrian Circle	2,522	5,507
Burgundian Circle	1,321	2,708
Electoral Rhenish Circle	600	2,707
Franconian Circle	980	1,902
Bavarian Circle	800	1,494
Swabian Circle	1,321	2,707
Upper Rhenish Circle	491	2,853
Lower Rhenish–Westphalian Circle	1,321	2,708
Upper Saxon Circle	1,322	2,707
Lower Saxon Circle	1,322	2,707
Total	12,000	28,000

The Reichsarmee reached its then peak size in 1695. In that year the Holy Roman Empire had a total of over 280,000 soldiers in the field, however only 41,300 of these came from circle system. The breakdown was as follows: 93,000 Imperial Army troops ("Austrians"), 41,300 Kreistruppen, 53,340 auxiliaries from the Empire in Dutch or English pay, 14,000 German auxiliaries in Habsburg pay deployed in Hungary, 21,000 Brandenburg-Prussians, 11,800 Savoyards (including 2,800 auxiliaries from Brandenburg in Savoyard pay), 12,000 Saxons, 10,000 Bavarians, 10,000 Palatines, 4,000 Mainzers, and 10,100 troops from the minor Rhineland states.

The figures for the contingents to be supplied by each Imperial Circle were little altered until the demise of the Empire. In practice, they were organized into a number of separate regiments. In some cases, money was provided instead of men to fulfil these military obligations to the Emperor.

== Campaigns ==
Between the 1590s and the French Revolutionary and Napoleonic Wars, the Army fought in the wars directly affecting the Empire, usually with units of the Imperial Army of the Holy Roman Emperor and other local territorial forces. It did not take part in the Thirty Years' War of 1618 to 1648.

- Austro-Turkish War (1663–1664)
- Franco-Dutch War (1673–1679)
- Nine Years' War (1688–1697)
- War of the Spanish Succession (1701–1714)
- War of the Polish Succession (1734–1735)
- Seven Years' War (1756-1763)
- War of the First Coalition (1792–1797)
- War of the Second Coalition (1798–1801)

== End ==
In 1804, the imperial forces originating from the lands of the new Emperor of Austria, a title created that year, became the Imperial and Royal Army (Kaiserlich-königliche Armee), which was defeated by the French at the battles of Ulm and Austerlitz in 1805. In 1806 the victorious French organized much of the former empire into the Confederation of the Rhine, a grouping of client states of the French Empire, with a common federal army.

== See also ==
- Imperial Army of the Holy Roman Emperor
- Imperial Austrian Army (1806–1867)
- Austro-Hungarian Armed Forces
- Hofkriegsrat
- List of Lieutenant Field Marshals of the Holy Roman Empire
